Hamas (an acronym of) is a Palestinian Sunni-Islamic fundamentalist, militant, and nationalist organization. It has a social service wing, Dawah, and a military wing, the Izz ad-Din al-Qassam Brigades. It won the 2006 Palestinian legislative election and became the de facto governing authority of the Gaza Strip following the 2007 Battle of Gaza. It also holds a majority in the parliament of the Palestinian National Authority.

Canada, the European Union, Israel, Japan, Australia, the United Kingdom and the United States have designated Hamas as a terrorist organization. New Zealand and Paraguay have designated only its military wing as a terrorist organization. It is not considered a terrorist organization by Brazil, China, Egypt, Iran, Norway, Qatar, Russia, Syria and Turkey. In December 2018, the United Nations General Assembly rejected a U.S. resolution condemning Hamas as a terrorist organization. Hamas leaders Ismail Haniyeh and Khaled Mashaal are based in Qatar.

Overview
Hamas was founded in 1987, soon after the First Intifada broke out, as an offshoot of the Egyptian Muslim Brotherhood which in its Gaza branch had previously been nonconfrontational toward Israel and hostile to the Palestine Liberation Organization (PLO). Co-founder Sheik Ahmed Yassin said in 1987, and the Hamas Charter affirmed in 1988, that Hamas was founded to liberate Palestine, including modern-day Israel, from Israeli occupation and to establish an Islamic state in the area that is now Israel, the West Bank and the Gaza Strip. Since 1994, the group has frequently stated that it would accept a truce if Israel withdraws to the 1967 borders, paid reparations, allowed free elections in the territories and gave Palestinian refugees the right to return.

Israel and Hamas have engaged in several wars of varying intensity. Hamas's military wing has launched attacks against Israeli civilians and soldiers, often describing them as retaliations, in particular for assassinations of the upper echelon of their leadership. Tactics have included suicide bombings and, since 2001, rocket attacks. Human Rights Watch has condemned as war crimes and crimes against humanity both Hamas and Israel for attacks on civilians during the conflict, stating that the rationale of reprisals is never valid when civilians are targeted.

In the January 2006 Palestinian parliamentary elections, Hamas won a majority in the PNA Parliament, defeating the PLO-affiliated Fatah party. After the elections, the Quartet (the European Union, Russia, the United Nations and the United States) made future foreign assistance to the PNA conditional upon the PNA's commitment to nonviolence, recognition of the state of Israel, and acceptance of previous agreements. Hamas rejected those conditions, which led the Quartet to suspend its foreign assistance program and Israel to impose economic sanctions on the Hamas-led administration. 

In March 2007, a national unity government headed by Prime Minister Ismail Haniyeh of Hamas was briefly formed, but this failed to restart international financial assistance. Tensions over control of Palestinian security forces soon erupted in the 2007 Battle of Gaza, after which Hamas took control of Gaza, while its officials were ousted from government positions in the West Bank. Israel and Egypt then imposed an economic blockade of the Gaza Strip on the grounds that Fatah forces were no longer providing security there.

Etymology
This acronym, HMS, was later glossed in the Hamas Covenant by the Arabic word  which itself means "zeal", "strength", or "bravery". In Hebrew, there is a similar-sounding word,  connoting "violence" and it has been suggested that the phonemic resemblance between the two terms may have conduced to abetting acrimonious relations between Israel and this Palestinian movement.

Aims
Hamas' declared objectives are to liberate Palestine from Israeli occupation and transform the country into an Islamic state. Which of these two objectives is the primary goal is disputed. The movement's original charter committed it to waging an armed struggle to destroy the state of Israel.

Leadership and structure

Hamas inherited from its predecessor a tripartite structure that consisted in the provision of social services, of religious training and military operations under a Shura Council. Traditionally it had four distinct functions: (a) a charitable social welfare division (dawah); (b) a military division for procuring weapons and undertaking operations (al-Mujahideen al Filastinun); (c) a security service (Jehaz Aman); and (d) a media branch (A'alam). Hamas has both an internal leadership within the West Bank and the Gaza Strip, and an external leadership, split between a Gaza group directed by Mousa Mohammed Abu Marzook from his exile first in Damascus and then in Egypt, and a Kuwaiti group (Kuwaidia) under Khaled Mashal. The Kuwaiti group of Palestinian exiles began to receive extensive funding from the Gulf States after its leader Mashal broke with Yasser Arafat's decision to side with Saddam Hussein in the Invasion of Kuwait, with Mashal insisting that Iraq withdraw. On May 6, 2017, Hamas' Shura Council chose Ismail Haniya to become the new leader, to replace Mashal.

The exact nature of the organization is unclear, secrecy being maintained for fear of Israeli assassinations and to conceal operational activities. Formally, Hamas maintains the wings are separate and independent. Matthew Levitt maintains this is a public myth. Davis argues that they are both separate and combined for reasons of internal and external political necessity. Communication between the political and military wings of Hamas is difficult, owing to the thoroughness of Israeli intelligence surveillance and the existence of an extensive base of informants. After the assassination of Abdel Aziz al-Rantisi the occasional political direction of the militant wing diminished, with field commanders given discretional autonomy on operations.

Consultative councils
The governing body is the Majlis al-Shura. The principle behind the council is based on the Qur'anic concept of consultation and popular assembly, which Hamas leaders argue provides for democracy within an Islamic framework. As the organization grew more complex and Israeli pressure increased it needed a broader base for decisions, the Shura Council was renamed the 'General Consultative Council', elected from members of local council groups and this in turn elected a 15-member Politburo (al-Maktab al-Siyasi) that made decisions at the highest level. Representatives come from Gaza, the West Bank, leaders in exile and Israeli prisons. This organ was located in Damascus until the Syrian Civil War led it to transfer to Qatar in January 2012, when Hamas sided with the civil opposition against the regime of Bashar al-Assad.

Social services wing
Hamas developed its social welfare programme by replicating the model established by Egypt's Muslim Brotherhood. For Hamas, charity and the development of one's community are both prescribed by religion and to be understood as forms of resistance. In Islamic tradition,  obliges the faithful to reach out to others by both proselytising and by charitable works, and typically the latter centre on the mosques which make use of both  endowment resources and charitable donations (one of the five pillars of Islam) to fund grassroots services like nurseries, schools, orphanages, soup kitchens, women's activities, library services and even sporting clubs within a larger context of preaching and political discussions. In the 1990s, some 85% of its budget was allocated to the provision of social services. Hamas has been called perhaps the most significant social services actor in Palestine. By 2000, Hamas or its affiliated charities ran roughly 40% of the social institutions in the West Bank and Gaza and, with other Islamic charities, by 2005, was supporting 120,000 individuals with monthly financial support in Gaza. Part of the appeal of these institutions is that they fill a vacuum in the administration by the PLO of the Palestinian territories, which had failed to cater to the demand for jobs and broad social services, and is widely viewed as corrupt. As late as 2005, the budget of Hamas, drawing on global charity contributions, was mostly tied up in covering running expenses for its social programmes, which extended from the supply of housing, food and water for the needy to more general functions like financial aid, medical assistance, educational development and religious instruction. A certain accounting flexibility allowed these funds to cover both charitable causes and military operations, permitting transfer from one to the other.

The  infrastructure itself was understood, within the Palestinian context, as providing the soil from which a militant opposition to the occupation would flower. In this regard it differs from the rival Palestinian Islamic Jihad which lacks any social welfare network, and relies on spectacular terrorist attacks to recruit adherents. In 2007, through funding from Iran, Hamas managed to allocate at a cost of $60 million, monthly stipends of $100 for 100,000 workers, and a similar sum for 3,000 fishermen laid idle by Israel's imposition of restrictions on fishing offshore, plus grants totalling $45 million to detainees and their families. Matthew Levitt argues that Hamas grants to people are subject to a rigorous cost-benefit analysis of how beneficiaries will support Hamas, with those linked to terrorist activities receiving more than others. Israel holds the families of suicide bombers accountable and bulldozes their homes, whereas the families of Hamas activists who have been killed or wounded during militant operations are given an initial, one-time grant varying between $500–$5,000, together with a $100 monthly allowance. Rent assistance is also given to families whose homes have been destroyed by Israeli bombing though families unaffiliated with Hamas are said to receive less.

Until 2007, these activities extended to the West Bank, but, after a PLO crackdown, now continue exclusively in the Gaza Strip. After the 2013 Egyptian coup d'état deposed the elected Muslim Brotherhood government of Mohamed Morsi in 2013, Hamas found itself in a financial straitjacket and has since endeavoured to throw the burden of responsibility for public works infrastructure in the Gaza Strip back onto the Palestinian National Authority, but without success.

Military wing

The Izz ad-Din al-Qassam Brigades is Hamas's military wing. Both propellant and the explosive were manufactured from chemical fertilizers, though TNT was also tried. Over the next five years of the conflict, a -warhead-armed version with a strike range of –, the Qassam 2, was also produced and in an incremental rise, these rocket types were fired towards Israeli settlements along the Gaza Strip: 4 in 2001, 35 in 2002, 155 in 2003, 281 in 2004, and 179 in 2005. By 2005, the Qassam 3 had been engineered with a – range and a  warhead. By 2006, 942 such rockets were launched into southern Israel. During the War with Israel in 2008–2009, Hamas deployed 122-mm Grad rocketry with a – range and a  warhead and a variety of guided Kornet antitank missiles. By 2012 Hamas had engineered a version of the Fajr-5 rocket, which was capable of reaching as far as Tel Aviv, as was shown after the assassination of Ahmed Jabari in that year. In the 2014 war its advanced rocketry reached Jerusalem, Tel Aviv and Haifa.

While the number of members is known only to the Brigades leadership, Israel estimates the Brigades have a core of several hundred members who receive military style training, including training in Iran and in Syria (before the Syrian Civil War). Additionally, the brigades have an estimated 10,000–17,000 operatives, forming a backup force whenever circumstances call for reinforcements for the Brigade. Recruitment training lasts for two years. The group's ideology outlines its aim as the liberation of Palestine and the restoration of Palestinian rights under the dispensations set forth in the Qur'an, and this translates into three policy priorities:

To evoke the spirit of Jihad (Resistance) among Palestinians, Arabs, and Muslims; to defend Palestinians and their land against the Zionist occupation and its manifestations; to liberate Palestinians and their land that was usurped by the Zionist occupation forces and settlers.

According to its official stipulations, the Izz ad-Din al-Qassam Brigades' military operations are to be restricted to operating only inside Palestine, engaging with Israeli soldiers, and in exercising the right of self-defense against armed settlers. They are to avoid civilian targets, to respect the enemy's humanity by refraining from mutilation, defacement or excessive killing, and to avoid targeting Westerners either in the occupied zones or beyond.

Down to 2007, the Brigades are estimated to have lost some 800 operatives in conflicts with Israeli forces. The leadership has been consistently undermined by targeted assassinations. Aside from Yahya Ayyash (January 5, 1996), it has lost Emad Akel (November 24, 1993), Salah Shehade (July 23, 2002), Ibrahim al-Makadmeh (March 8, 2003), Ismail Abu Shanab (August 21, 2003), Ahmed Yassin (March 22, 2004), and Abdel Aziz al-Rantisi (April 17, 2004).

The Izz ad-Din al-Qassam Brigades groups its fighters in 4–5 man cells, which in turn are integrated into companies and battalions. Unlike the political section, which is split between an internal and external structure, the Brigades are under a local Palestinian leadership, and disobedience with the decisions taken by the political leadership have been relatively rare.

Although the Izz al-Din al-Qassam Brigades are an integral part of Hamas, the exact nature of the relationship is hotly debated. They appear to operate at times independently of Hamas, exercising a certain autonomy. Some cells have independent links with the external leadership, enabling them to bypass the hierarchical command chain and political leadership in Gaza. Ilana Kass and Bard O'Neill, likening Hamas's relationship with the Brigades to the political party Sinn Féin's relationship to the military arm of the Irish Republican Army. quote a senior Hamas official as stating: "The Izz al-Din al-Qassam Brigade is a separate armed military wing, which has its own leaders who do not take their orders from Hamas and do not tell us of their plans in advance."

Finances and funding
Hamas, like its predecessor the Muslim Brotherhood, assumed the administration of Gaza's waqf properties, endowments which extend over 10% of all real estate in the Gaza Strip, with 2,000 acres of agricultural land held in religious trusts, together with numerous shops, rentable apartments and public buildings.

In the first five years of the 1st Intifada, the Gaza economy, 50% of which depended on external sources of income, plummeted by 30–50% as Israel closed its labour market and remittances from the Palestinian expatriates in the Gulf countries dried up following the 1991–1992 Gulf War. At the 1993 Philadelphia conference, Hamas leaders' statements indicated that they read George H. W. Bush's outline of a New World Order as embodying a tacit aim to destroy Islam, and that therefore funding should focus on enhancing the Islamic roots of Palestinian society and promoting jihad, which also means zeal for social justice, in the occupied territories. Hamas became particularly fastidious about maintaining separate resourcing for its respective branches of activity—military, political and social services. It has had a holding company in East Jerusalem (Beit al-Mal), a 20% stake in Al Aqsa International Bank which served as its financial arm, the Sunuqrut Global Group and al-Ajouli money-changing firm.

By 2011, Hamas's budget, calculated to be roughly US$70 million, derived even more substantially (85%) from foreign, rather than internal Palestinian, sources. Only two Israeli-Palestinian sources figure in a list seized in 2004, while the other contributors were donor bodies located in Jordan, Qatar, Kuwait, Saudi Arabia, Britain, Germany, the United States, United Arab Emirates, Italy and France. Much of the money raised comes from sources that direct their assistance to what Hamas describes as its charitable work for Palestinians, but investments in support of its ideological position are also relevant, with Persian Gulf States and Saudi Arabia prominent in the latter. Matthew Levitt claims that Hamas also taps money from corporations, criminal organizations and financial networks that support terror. It is also alleged that it engages in cigarette and drug smuggling, multimedia copyright infringement and credit card fraud. The United States, Israel and the EU have shut down many charities and organs that channel money to Hamas, such as the Holy Land Foundation for Relief. Between 1992 and 2001, this group is said to have provided $6.8 million to Palestinian charities of the $57 million collected. By 2001, it was alleged to have given Hamas $13 million, and was shut down shortly afterwards.

About half of Hamas's funding came from states in the Persian Gulf down to the mid 2000s. Saudi Arabia supplied half of the Hamas budget of $50 million in the early 2000s, but, under U.S. pressure, began cut its funding by cracking down on Islamic charities and private donor transfers to Hamas in 2004, which by 2006 drastically reduced the flow of money from that area. Iran and Syria, in the aftermath of Hamas's 2006 electoral victory, stepped in to fill the shortfall. Saudi funding, negotiated with third parties like Egypt, remained supportive of Hamas as a Sunni group but chose to provide more assistance to the PNA, the electoral loser, when the EU responded to the outcome by suspending its monetary aid. During the 1980s, Iran began to provide 10% of Hamas's funding, which it increased annually until by the 1990s it supplied $30 million. It accounted for $22 million, over a quarter of Hamas's budget, by the late 2000s. According to Matthew Levitt, Iran preferred direct financing to operative groups rather than charities, requiring video proof of attacks.  Much of the Iran funding is said to be channeled through Hezbollah. After 2006, Iran's willingness to take over the burden of the shortfall created by the drying up of Saudi funding also reflected the geopolitical tensions between the two, since, though Shiite, Iran was supporting a Sunni group traditionally closely linked with the Saudi kingdom. The US imposed sanctions on Iran's Bank Saderat, alleging it had funneled hundreds of millions to Hamas. The US has expressed concerns that Hamas obtains funds through Palestinian and Lebanese sympathizers of Arab descent in the Foz do Iguaçu area of the tri-border region of Latin America, an area long associated with arms trading, drug trafficking, contraband, the manufacture of counterfeit goods, money-laundering and currency fraud. The State Department adds that confirmatory information of a Hamas operational presence there is lacking.

After 2009, sanctions on Iran made funding difficult, forcing Hamas to rely on religious donations by individuals in the West Bank, Qatar, and Saudi Arabia. Funds amounting to tens of millions of dollars raised in the Gulf states were transferred through the Rafah Border Crossing. These were not sufficient to cover the costs of governing the Strip and running the al Qassam Brigades, and when tensions arose with Iran over support of President Assad in Syria, Iran dropped its financial assistance to the government, restricting its funding to the military wing, which meant a drop from $150 million in 2012 to $60 million the following year. A further drop occurred in 2015 when Hamas expressed its criticisms of Iran's role in the Yemeni Civil War.

In 2017, the PA government imposed its own sanctions against Gaza, including, among other things, cutting off salaries to thousands of PA employees, as well as financial assistance to hundreds of families in the Gaza Strip. The PA initially said it would stop paying for the electricity and fuel that Israel supplies to the Gaza Strip, but after a year partially backtracked. The Israeli government has allowed millions of dollars from Qatar to be funneled on a regular basis through Israel to Hamas, to replace the millions of dollars the PA had stopped transferring to Hamas. Israeli Prime Minister Benjamin Netanyahu explained that letting the money go through Israel meant that it could not be used for terrorism, saying: "Now that we are supervising, we know it's going to humanitarian causes."

History

Origins 
Hamas's origins can be traced to the foundation of the Muslim Brotherhood in Egypt in 1928. The Muslim Brotherhood arose as an attempt to have Islamic values extend beyond the mosque into the secular sphere, where it challenged the core assumptions, social, political, ideological, nationalist and economic of the existing ruling order. In 1935 it established contacts in Mandatory Palestine and in 1945 inaugurated its first branch in Jerusalem, and in Gaza in late November the following  year. Following the Nakba in 1948, which shattered Palestinian society, the Muslim Brotherhood was one of the first organizations to reestablish itself among the Palestinians.

When Israel occupied the Palestinian territories in 1967, the Muslim Brotherhood members did not take active part in the resistance, preferring to focus on social-religious reform and on restoring Islamic values. This outlook changed in the early 1980s and Islamic organizations became more involved in Palestinian politics. The driving force behind this transformation was Ahmed Yassin, a Palestinian refugee from Al-Jura. Of humble origins and quadriplegic, he persevered to become one of the Muslim Brotherhood's leaders in Gaza. His charisma and conviction brought him a loyal group of followers, who he, as a quadriplegic, depended on for everything—from feeding him, to transporting him to and from events, and to communicate his strategy to the public.

In 1973, Yassin founded the social-religious charity al-Mujama al-Islamiya ("Islamic center") in Gaza as an offshoot to the Muslim Brotherhood. The Israeli authorities encouraged Yassin's charity to expand as they saw it as a useful counterbalance to the secular Palestine Liberation Organization. Yitzhak Segev, who was the Israeli military governor of Gaza at the time, recalled that they even funded his charity: "The Israeli government gave me a budget, and the military government gives to the mosques". Israel's religious affairs official in Gaza, Avner Cohen, later regretfully concluded that Hamas was created by Israel. He claimed to have warned his superiors not to back the Islamists.

In 1984 Yassin was arrested after the Israelis found out that his group collected arms, but released in May 1985 as part of a prisoner exchange. He continued to expand the reach of his charity in Gaza. Following his release, he set up al-Majd (an acronym for Munazamat al-Jihad wa al-Da'wa), headed by former student leader Yahya Sinwar and Rawhi Mushtaha, tasked with handling internal security and hunting local informants for the Israeli intelligence services. At about the same time, he ordered former student leader Salah Shehade to set up al-Mujahidun al-Filastiniun (Palestinian fighters), but its militants were quickly rounded up by Israeli authorities and had their arms confiscated.

The idea of Hamas began to take form on December 10, 1987, when several members of the Brotherhood convened the day after an incident in which an Israeli army truck had crashed into a car at a Gaza checkpoint killing 4 Palestinian day-workers. They met at Yassin's house and decided that they too needed to react in some manner as the protest riots sparking the First Intifada erupted. A leaflet issued on the 14 December calling for resistance is considered to mark their first public intervention, though the name Hamas itself was not used until January 1988. Yassin was not directly connected to the organization but he gave it his blessing. In a meeting with the Jordanian Muslim Brotherhood in February 1988, it too gave its approval. To many Palestinians it appeared to engage more authentically with their national expectations, since it merely provided an Islamic version of what had been the PLO's original goals, armed struggle to liberate all of Palestine, rather than the territorial compromise the PLO acquiesced in—a small fragment of Mandatory Palestine.

Creating Hamas as an entity distinct from the Muslim Brotherhood was a matter of practicality; the Muslim Brotherhood refused to engage in violence against Israel, but without participating in the intifada, the Islamists tied to it feared they would lose support to their rivals the Palestinian Islamic Jihad and the PLO. They also hoped that by keeping its militant activities separate, Israel would not interfere with its social work.

Hamas published its charter in August 1988, wherein it defined itself as a chapter of the Muslim Brotherhood and its desire to establish "an Islamic state throughout Palestine" (for details on the charter see Hamas Charter (1988)).

Co-founder Yassin was convinced that Israel was endeavouring to destroy Islam, and concluded that loyal Muslims had a religious obligation to destroy Israel. The short-term goal of Hamas was to liberate Palestine, including modern-day Israel, from Israeli occupation. The long-term aim sought to establish an Islamic state from the Jordan River to the Mediterranean Sea, remarkably similar to, and perhaps derived from, the Zionist notion of the same area under a Jewish majority.

First Intifada 

Hamas's first strike against Israel came in the spring 1989 as it abducted and killed Avi Sasportas and Ilan Saadon, two Israeli soldiers. At the time, Shehade and Sinwar served time in Israeli prisons and Hamas had set up a new group, Unit 101, headed by Mahmoud al-Mabhouh, whose objective was to abduct soldiers. The discovery of Sasportas' body triggered, in the words of Jean-Pierre Filiu, 'an extremely violent Israeli response': hundreds of Hamas leaders and activists, among them Yassin, who was sentenced to life in prison, were arrested, and Hamas was outlawed. This mass detention of activists, together with a further wave of arrests in 1990, effectively dismantled Hamas and, devastated, it was forced to adapt; its command system became regionalized to make its operative structure more diffuse, and to minimize the chances of being detected.

Anger following the al-Aqsa massacre in October 1990 in which Muslim worshippers had tried to prevent Orthodox Jews from placing a foundation stone for the Third Temple on the Temple Mount and Israeli police fired into the al-Aqsa mosque, killing 17, caused Hamas to intensify its campaign of abductions. Hamas declared every Israeli soldier a target and called for a "jihad against the Zionist enemy everywhere, in all fronts and every means."

Hamas reorganized its units from al-Majd and al-Mujahidun al-Filastiniun into a military wing called the Izz ad-Din al-Qassam Brigades led by Yahya Ayyash in the summer of 1991 or 1992. The name comes from the militant Palestinian nationalist leader Sheikh Izz ad-Din al-Qassam who fought against the British and whose death in 1935 sparked the 1936–1939 Arab revolt in Palestine. Though its members sometimes referred to themselves as "Students of Ayyash", "Students of the Engineer", or "Yahya Ayyash Units". At the outset, weapons were hard to come by, and the organization began to resort to intermittent kidnappings of soldiers to secure arms and munitions.

Ayyash, an engineering graduate from Birzeit University, was a skillful bomb maker and greatly improved Hamas' striking capability, earning him the nickname al-Muhandis ("the Engineer"). He is thought to have been one of the driving forces in Hamas' use of suicide bombings, arguing that "we paid a high price when we only used slingshots and stones. We need to exert more pressure, make the cost of the occupation that much more expensive in human lives, that much more unbearable". Until his assassination by Shin Bet in 1996, almost all bombs used on suicide missions were constructed by him.

In December 1992 Israel responded to the killing of a border police officer by exiling 415 members of Hamas and Islamic Jihad to Southern Lebanon, at the time occupied by Israel. There Hamas established contacts with Hezbollah, Palestinians living in refugee camps, and learnt how to construct suicide and car bombs. Israel accompanied the deportations by the imposition of a two-week curfew on the Strip, causing an income shortfall for its economy of $1,810,000 per diem. The deportees were allowed to return nine months later. The deportation provoked international condemnation and a unanimous UN Security Council resolution condemning the action. Hamas ordered two car bombs in retaliation for the deportation.

Hamas first suicide bombing took place at Mehola Junction in the West Bank in April 1993 using a car parked between two buses, carrying soldiers. Aside from the bomber, the blast killed a Palestinian who worked in a nearby settlement. The bomb design was flawed but Hamas would soon learn how to manufacture more lethal bombs.

Collaborators 
In the first years of the Intifada, Hamas violence was restricted to Palestinians; collaborators with Israel and individuals it defined as "moral deviants," that is, drug dealers and prostitutes known to enjoy ties with Israeli criminal networks, or for engaging in loose behavior, such as seducing women in hairdressing salons with alcohol, behaviour Hamas considered was encouraged by Israeli agents. Hamas leaders likened their rooting out of collaborators to what the French resistance did with Nazi collaborators in World War II. In 1992 alone they executed more than 150. Details of the methods were published in The New York Times in 1993. In Western media this was reported as typical "intercommunal strife" among Arabs.

Hamas's actions in the First Intifada expanded its popularity. In 1989 fewer than three percent of the Palestinians in Gaza supported Hamas. By October 1993 this figure had increased to 13%, a number that still paled in comparison to Fatah which enjoyed the support of 45% of the Palestinians in the occupied territories.

Oslo years 
In February 1994, Baruch Goldstein, a Jewish settler in military fatigues, massacred 29 Muslims at prayer in the Ibrahimi Mosque in Hebron in the West Bank during the month of Ramadan. An additional 19 Palestinians were killed by Israeli forces in the ensuing riots. Israeli Prime Minister Yitzhak Rabin condemned the massacre but fearing a confrontation with Hebron's violent settler community, he refused to withdraw them, and Hamas swore to avenge the deaths. In a communique it announced that if Israel didn't discriminate between "fighters and civilians" then it would be "forced ... to treat the Zionists in the same manner. Treating like with like is a universal principle."

At the end of the 40-day mourning period for Goldstein's victims, on April 6, a suicide bomber blew up his car at a crowded bus stop in Afula, killing eight Israelis and injuring 34. An additional five Israelis were killed and 30 injured as a Palestinian detonated himself on a bus in Hadera a week later. Hamas claimed responsibility for both attacks which were the first suicide bombings in Israel. The attacks may have been timed to disrupt negotiations between Israel and PLO on the implementation of the Oslo I Accord.

A bomb on a bus in downtown Tel Aviv in October, killing 22 and injuring 45, was Hamas first successful attack in the city.

In late December 1995, Hamas promised the Palestinian Authority (PA) to cease military operations. But it was not to be as Shin Bet assassinated Ayyash, the 29-year-old leader of the al-Qassam Brigades on January 5, 1996 using a booby-trapped cellphone given to Ayyash by his uncle who worked as an informer. Nearly 100,000 Gazans, about 11% of the total population, marched in his funeral. Hamas resumed its campaign of suicide bombings which had been dormant for a good part of 1995 to retaliate the assassination.

In September 1997, Israel's Prime Minister Benjamin Netanyahu ordered the assassination of Hamas leader Khaled Mashal who lived in Jordan. Two Mossad agents entered Jordan on false Canadian passports and sprayed Mashal with a nerve agent on a street in Amman. They were caught however and King Hussein threatened to put the agents on trial unless Israel provided Mashal with an antidote and released Yassin. Israel obliged and the antidote saved Mashal's life. Yassin was returned to Gaza where he was given a hero's welcome with banners calling him the "sheikh of the Intifada". Yassin's release temporarily boosted Hamas' popularity and at a press conference Yassin declared: "There will be no halt to armed operations until the end of the occupation ... we are peace-seekers. We love peace. And we call on them [the Israelis] to maintain peace with us and to help us in order to restore our rights by peace."

Although the suicide attacks by the al-Qassam Brigades and other groups violated the 1993 Oslo accords (which Hamas opposed), Arafat was reluctant to pursue the attackers and may have had inadequate means to do so.

Impact of the Hebron massacre 

The Hebron massacre had a profound effect on Hamas' militancy. For its first seven years, it attacked only what it saw as "legitimate military targets," Israeli soldiers and military installations. But following the massacre, it felt that it no longer had to distinguish between military and civilian targets. The leader of the Muslim Brotherhood in the West Bank, Sheikh Ahmed Haj Ali, later argued that "had there not been the 1994 Ibrahimi Mosque massacre, there would have been no suicide bombings." Al-Rantisi in an interview in 1998 stated that the suicide attacks "began after the massacre committed by the terrorist Baruch Goldstein and intensified after the assassination of Yahya Ayyash." Musa Abu Marzouk put the blame for the escalation on the Israelis: "We were against targeting civilians ... After the Hebron massacre we determined that it was time to kill Israel's civilians ... we offered to stop if Israel would, but they rejected that offer."

According to Matti Steinberg, former advisor to Shin Bet and one of Israel's leading experts on Hamas, the massacre laid to rest an internal debate within Hamas on the usefulness of indiscriminate violence: "In the Hamas writings there is an explicit prohibition against indiscriminate harm to helpless people. The massacre at the mosque released them from this taboo and introduced a dimension of measure for measure, based on citations from the Koran."

Expulsion from Jordan 
In 1999 Hamas was banned in Jordan, reportedly in part at the request of the United States, Israel, and the Palestinian Authority. Jordan's King Abdullah feared the activities of Hamas and its Jordanian allies would jeopardize peace negotiations between the Palestinian Authority and Israel, and accused Hamas of engaging in illegitimate activities within Jordan. In mid-September 1999, authorities arrested Hamas leaders Khaled Mashal and Ibrahim Ghosheh on their return from a visit to Iran, and charged them with being members of an illegal organization, storing weapons, conducting military exercises, and using Jordan as a training base. The Hamas leaders denied the charges. Mashal was exiled and eventually settled in Damascus in Syria in 2001. As a result of the Syrian civil war he distanced himself from Bashar al-Assad's regime in 2012 and moved to Qatar.

Popular support 
While the Palestinians were used to the idea that their young was willing to die for the struggle, the idea that they would strap explosives to their bodies and blow themselves up was a new and not well-supported development. A poll taken in 1996 after the wave of suicide bombings Hamas carried out to retaliate Israel's assassination of Ayyash showed that most 70% opposed the tactic and 59% called for Arafat to take action to prevent further attacks.

In the political arena Hamas continued to trail far behind its rival Fatah; 41% trusted Arafat in 1996 but only 3% trusted Yassin.

Second Intifada

In contrast to the preceding uprising, the Al-Aqsa or Second Intifada began violently, with mass demonstrations and lethal Israeli counter-insurgency tactics. Prior to the incidents surrounding Ariel Sharon's visit to the Temple Mount, Palestinian support for violence against Israelis and for Hamas had been gauged to be 52% and 10%, respectively. By July of the following year, after almost a year of savage conflict, polling indicated that 86% of Palestinians endorsed violence against Israelis and support for Hamas had risen to 17%.

The al-Qassam Brigades were among the many militant groups that launched both military-style attacks and suicide bombings against Israeli civilian and military targets in this period. In the ensuing years almost 5000 Palestinians and over 1100 Israelis were killed. While there was a large number of Palestinian attacks against Israelis, the Palestinians' most effective form of violence were suicide attacks; in the first five years of the intifada a little more than half of all Israeli deaths were victims of suicide attacks. Hamas was responsible for about 40% of the 135 suicide attacks in the period.

Whatever the immediate circumstances triggering the uprising, a more general cause, writes U.S. political science professor Jeremy Pressman, was "popular Palestinian discontent [that] grew during the Oslo peace process because the reality on the ground did not match the expectations created by the peace agreements". Hamas would be the beneficiary of this growing discontent in the 2006 Palestinian Authority legislative elections.

According to Tristan Dunning, Israel has never responded to repeated offers by Hamas over subsequent years for a quid pro quo moratorium on attacks against civilians'. It has engaged in several tadi'a (periods of calm), and proposed a number of ceasefires. In January 2004, Hamas leader Ahmed Yassin, prior to his assassination, said that the group would end armed resistance against Israel for a 10-year hudna. in exchange for a Palestinian state in the West Bank, Gaza Strip, and East Jerusalem, and that restoring Palestinians' "historical rights" (relating to the 1948 Palestinian exodus) "would be left for future generations". His views were quickly echoed by senior Hamas official Abdel Aziz al-Rantissi, who added that Hamas envisaged a "phased liberation". Israel's response was to assassinate Yassin in March in a targeted Israeli air strike, and then al-Rantisi in a similar air strike in April.

2006 presidential and legislative elections

Hamas boycotted the 1996 Palestinian general election and the 2005 Palestinian presidential election, but decided to participate in the 2006 Palestinian legislative election, the first to take place after the death of Yassir Arafat. The EU figured prominently in the proposal that democratic elections be held in the territories. In the run-up to the polling day, the US administration's Condoleezza Rice, Israel's Tzipi Livni and British Prime Minister Tony Blair all expressed reservations about allowing Hamas to compete in a democratic process. Hamas ran on a platform of clean government, a thorough overhaul of the corrupt administrative system, and the issue of rampant lawlessness. The PA, notoriously riddled with corruption, chose to run Marwan Barghouti as its leading candidate, who was serving five life sentences in Israel. The US donated two million dollars to the PA to improve its media image. Israel also assisted the PA by allowing Barghouti to be interviewed in prison by Arab television and by permitting 100,000 Palestinians in East Jerusalem to vote.

Crucially, the election took place shortly after Israel had evacuated its settlements in Gaza. The evacuation, executed without consulting Fatah, gave currency to Hamas' view that resistance had compelled Israel to leave Gaza. In a statement Hamas portrayed it as a vindication of their strategy of armed resistance ("Four years of resistance surpassed 10 years of bargaining") and Muhammed Deif attributed "the Liberation of Gaza" to his comrades "love of martyrdom".

Hamas, intent on displaying its power through a plebiscite rather than by violence, announcing that it would refrain from attacks on Israel if Israel were to desist from its offensive against Palestinian towns and villages. Its election manifesto dropped the Islamic agenda, spoke of sovereignty for the Palestinian territories, including Jerusalem (an implicit endorsement of the two-state solution), while conceding nothing about its claims to all of Palestine. It mentioned "armed resistance" twice and affirmed in article 3.6 that it was a right to resist the "terrorism of occupation". A Palestinian Christian figured on its candidate list.

Hamas won 76 seats, excluding four won by independents supporting Hamas, and Fatah only 43. The election was judged by international observers to have been "competitive and genuinely democratic". The EU said that they had been run better than elections in some members countries of the union, and promised to maintain its financial support. Egypt, Saudi Arabia, Qatar, and the United Arab Emirates urged the US to give Hamas a chance, and that it was inadvisable to punish Palestinians for their choice, a position also endorsed by the Arab League a month later. The EU's promise was short-lived; three months later, in violating of its core principles regarding free elections, it abruptly froze financial assistance to the Hamas-led government, following the example set by the US and Canada. It undertook to instead channel funds directly to people and projects, and pay salaries only to Fatah members, employed or otherwise.

Hamas assumed the administration of Gaza following its electoral victory and introduced radical changes. It inherited a chaotic situation of lawlessness, since the economic sanctions imposed by Israel, the US and the Quartet had crippled the PA's administrative resources, leading to the emergence of numerous mafia-style gangs and terror cells modeled after Al Qaeda. Writing in Foreign Affairs, Daniel Byman later stated:
After it took over the Gaza Strip Hamas revamped the police and security forces, cutting them 50,000 members (on paper, at least) under Fatah to smaller, efficient forces of just over 10,000, which then cracked down on crime and gangs. No longer did groups openly carry weapons or steal with impunity. People paid their taxes and electric bills, and in return authorities picked up garbage and put criminals in jail. Gaza-neglected under Egyptian and then Israeli control, and misgoverned by Palestinian leader Yasir Arafat and his successors-finally has a real government.'

In early February 2006, Hamas offered Israel a ten-year truce "in return for a complete Israeli withdrawal from the occupied Palestinian territories: the West Bank, Gaza Strip and East Jerusalem," and recognition of Palestinian rights including the "right of return". Mashal added that Hamas was not calling for a final end to armed operations against Israel, and it would not impede other Palestinian groups from carrying out such operations.

National Unity Government
After the election, the Quartet on the Middle East (the United States, Russia, the European Union (EU), and the United Nations) stated that assistance to the Palestinian Authority would only continue if Hamas renounced violence, recognized Israel, and accepted previous Israeli-Palestinian agreements, which Hamas refused to do. The Quartet then imposed a freeze on all international aid to the Palestinian territories. In 2006 after the Gaza election, Hamas leader sent a letter addressed to George W. Bush where he among other things declared that Hamas would accept a state on the 1967 borders including a truce. However, the Bush administration did not reply.

Legislative policy and reforming the judiciary
Khaled Hroub wrote that Hamas' "[s]tress the separation between the three powers, the legislative, executive and judicial; activate the role of the Constitutional Court; re-form the Judicial Supreme Council and choose its members by elections and on the basis of qualifications rather than partisan, personal, and social considerations [...]; enact the necessary laws that guarantee the neutrality of general prosecutor [...] [and] laws that will stop any transgression by the executive power on the constitution."

Public freedoms and citizen rights
Hroub reported that Hamas' new documents include to "[a]chieve equality before the law among citizens in rights and duties; bring security to all citizens and protect their properties and assure their safety against arbitrary arrest, torture, or revenge; stress the culture of dialogue [...]; support the press and media institutions and maintain the right of journalists to access and to publish information; maintain freedom and independence of professional syndicates and preserve the rights of their membership."

Hamas–Fatah conflict

After the formation of the Hamas-led cabinet on March 20, 2006, tensions between Fatah and Hamas militants progressively rose in the Gaza strip as Fatah commanders refused to take orders from the government while the Palestinian Authority initiated a campaign of demonstrations, assassinations and abductions against Hamas, which led to Hamas responding. Israeli intelligence warned Mahmoud Abbas that Hamas had planned to kill him at his office in Gaza. According to a Palestinian source close to Abbas, Hamas considers president Abbas to be a barrier to its complete control over the Palestinian Authority and decided to kill him. In a statement to Al Jazeera, Hamas leader Mohammed Nazzal, accused Abbas of being party to besieging and isolating the Hamas-led government.

On June 9, 2006, during an Israeli artillery operation, an explosion occurred on a busy Gaza beach, killing eight Palestinian civilians. It was assumed that Israeli shellings were responsible for the killings, but Israeli government officials denied this. Hamas formally withdrew from its 16-month ceasefire on June 10, taking responsibility for the subsequent Qassam rocket attacks launched from Gaza into Israel.

On June 25, two Israeli soldiers were killed and another, Gilad Shalit, captured following an incursion by the Izz ad-Din al-Qassam Brigades, Popular Resistance Committees and Army of Islam. In response, the Israeli military launched Operation Summer Rains three days later, to secure the release of the kidnapped soldier, arresting 64 Hamas officials. Among them were 8 Palestinian Authority cabinet ministers and up to 20 members of the Palestinian Legislative Council, The arrests, along with other events, effectively prevented the Hamas-dominated legislature from functioning during most of its term. Shalit was held captive until 2011, when he was released in exchange for 1,027 Palestinian prisoners. Since then, Hamas has continued building a network of internal and cross-border tunnels, which are used to store and deploy weapons, shield militants, and facilitate cross-border attacks. Destroying the tunnels was a primary objective of Israeli forces in the 2014 Israel–Gaza conflict.

In February 2007 Saudi-sponsored negotiations led to the Hamas & Fatah Mecca Agreement to form a unity government, signed by Mahmoud Abbas on behalf of Fatah and Khaled Mashal on behalf of Hamas. The new government was called on to achieve Palestinian national goals as approved by the Palestine National Council, the clauses of the Basic Law and the National Reconciliation Document (the "Prisoners' Document") as well as the decisions of the Arab summit.

In March 2007, the Palestinian Legislative Council established a national unity government, with 83 representatives voting in favor and three against. Government ministers were sworn in by Mahmoud Abbas, the chairman of the Palestinian Authority, at a ceremony held simultaneously in Gaza and Ramallah. In June that year, renewed fighting broke out between Hamas and Fatah. In a leaked comment by Major General Yadlin to the American Ambassador Richard H Jones at this point (June 12, 2007), Yadlin emphasized Hamas's electoral victory and an eventual Fatah withdrawal from Gaza would be advantageous to Israeli interests, in that the PLO's relocation to the West Bank would allow Israel to treat the Gaza Strip and Hamas as a hostile country. In the course of the June 2007 Battle of Gaza, Hamas exploited the near total collapse of Palestinian Authority forces in Gaza, to seize control of Gaza, ousting Fatah officials. President Mahmoud Abbas then dismissed the Hamas-led Palestinian Authority government. and outlawed the Hamas militia. At least 600 Palestinians died in fighting between Hamas and Fatah. Human Rights Watch, a U.S.-based group, accused both sides in the conflict of torture and war crimes.

Human Rights Watch estimates several hundred Gazans were "maimed" and tortured in the aftermath of the Gaza War. 73 Gazan men accused of "collaborating" had their arms and legs broken by "unidentified perpetrators" and 18 Palestinians accused of collaborating with Israel, who had escaped from Gaza's main prison compound after Israel bombed the facility, were executed by Hamas security officials in the first days of the conflict. Hamas security forces attacked hundreds Fatah officials who supported Israel. Human Rights Watch interviewed one such person:

In March 2012 Mahmoud Abbas stated that there were no political differences between Hamas and Fatah as they had reached agreement on a joint political platform and on a truce with Israel. Commenting on relations with Hamas, Abbas revealed in an interview with Al Jazeera that "We agreed that the period of calm would be not only in the Gaza Strip, but also in the West Bank," adding that "We also agreed on a peaceful popular resistance [against Israel], the establishment of a Palestinian state along the 1967 borders and that the peace talks would continue if Israel halted settlement construction and accepted our conditions." Progress has stalled, until an April 2014 agreement to form a compromise unity government, with elections to be held in late 2014. These elections did not take place and following a new agreement, the next Palestinian general election is scheduled to take place by the end of March, 2021.

2008–2009 Gaza War

On June 17, 2008, Egyptian mediators announced that an informal truce had been agreed to between Hamas and Israel. Hamas agreed to cease rocket attacks on Israel, while Israel agreed to allow limited commercial shipping across its border with Gaza, barring any breakdown of the tentative peace deal; Hamas also hinted that it would discuss the release of Gilad Shalit. Israeli sources state that Hamas also committed itself to enforce the ceasefire on the other Palestinian organizations. Even before the truce was agreed to, some on the Israeli side were not optimistic about it, Shin Bet chief Yuval Diskin stating in May 2008 that a ground incursion into Gaza was unavoidable and would more effectively quell arms smuggling and pressure Hamas into relinquishing power.

While Hamas was careful to maintain the ceasefire, the lull was sporadically violated by other groups, sometimes in defiance of Hamas. For example, on June 24 Islamic Jihad launched rockets at the Israeli town of Sderot; Israel called the attack a grave violation of the informal truce, and closed its border crossings with Gaza. On November 4, 2008, Israeli forces, in an attempt to stop construction of a tunnel, killed six Hamas gunmen in a raid inside the Gaza Strip. Hamas responded by resuming rocket attacks, a total of 190 rockets in November according to Israel's military.

With the six-month truce officially expired on December 19, Hamas launched 50 to more than 70 rockets and mortars into Israel over the next three days, though no Israelis were injured. On December 21, Hamas said it was ready to stop the attacks and renew the truce if Israel stopped its "aggression" in Gaza and opened up its border crossings.

On December 27 and 28, Israel implemented Operation Cast Lead against Hamas. Egyptian President Hosni Mubarak said "We warned Hamas repeatedly that rejecting the truce would push Israel to aggression against Gaza." According to Palestinian officials, over 280 people were killed and 600 were injured in the first two days of airstrikes. Most were Hamas police and security officers, though many civilians also died. According to Israel, militant training camps, rocket-manufacturing facilities and weapons warehouses that had been pre-identified were hit, and later they attacked rocket and mortar squads who fired around 180 rockets and mortars at Israeli communities. Chief of Gaza police force Tawfiq Jabber, head of the General Security Service Salah Abu Shrakh, senior religious authority and security officer Nizar Rayyan, and Interior Minister Said Seyam were among those killed during the fighting. Although Israel sent out thousands of cell-phone messages urging residents of Gaza to leave houses where weapons may be stored, in an attempt to minimise civilian casualties, some residents complained there was nowhere to go because many neighborhoods had received the same message. Israeli bombs landed close to civilian structures such as schools, and some alleged that Israel was deliberately targeting Palestinian civilians.

Israel declared a unilateral ceasefire on January 17, 2009. Hamas responded the following day by announcing a one-week ceasefire to give Israel time to withdraw its forces from the Gaza Strip. Israeli, Palestinian, and third-party sources disagreed on the total casualty figures from the Gaza war, and the number of Palestinian casualties who were civilians. In November 2010, a senior Hamas official acknowledged that up to 300 fighters were killed and "In addition to them, between 200 and 300 fighters from the Al-Qassam Brigades and another 150 security forces were martyred." These new numbers reconcile the total with those of the Israeli military, which originally said were 709 "terror operatives" killed.

After the Gaza War
On August 16, 2009, Hamas leader Khaled Mashal stated that the organization is ready to open dialogue with the Obama administration because its policies are much better than those of former U.S. president George W. Bush: "As long as there's a new language, we welcome it, but we want to see not only a change of language, but also a change of policies on the ground. We have said that we are prepared to cooperate with the US or any other international party that would enable the Palestinians to get rid of occupation." Despite this, an August 30, 2009 speech during a visit to Jordan in which Mashal expressed support for the Palestinian right of return was interpreted by David Pollock of the Washington Institute for Near East Policy as a sign that "Hamas has now clearly opted out of diplomacy." In an interview in May 2010, Mashal said that if a Palestinian state with real sovereignty was established under the conditions he set out, on the borders of 1967 with its capital Jerusalem and with the right of return, that will be the end of the Palestinian resistance, and then the nature of any subsequent ties with Israel would be decided democratically by the Palestinians. In July 2009, Khaled Mashal, Hamas's political bureau chief, stated Hamas's willingness to cooperate with a resolution to the Arab-Israeli conflict, which included a Palestinian state based on 1967 borders, provided that Palestinian refugees be given the right to return to Israel and that East Jerusalem be recognized as the new state's capital.

In 2011, after the outbreak of the Syrian Civil War, Hamas distanced itself from the Syrian regime and its members began leaving Syria. Where once there were "hundreds of exiled Palestinian officials and their relatives", that number shrunk to "a few dozen". In 2012, Hamas publicly announced its support for the Syrian opposition. This prompted Syrian state TV to issue a "withering attack" on the Hamas leadership. Khaled Mashal said that Hamas had been "forced out" of Damascus because of its disagreements with the Syrian regime. In late October, Syrian Army soldiers shot dead two Hamas leaders in Daraa refugee camp. On November 5, 2012, the Syrian state security forces shut down all Hamas offices in the country. In January 2013, another two Hamas members were found dead in Syria's Husseinieh camp. Activists said the two had been arrested and executed by state security forces. In 2013, it was reported that the military wing of Hamas had begun training units of the Free Syrian Army. In 2013, after "several intense weeks of indirect three-way diplomacy between representatives of Hamas, Israel, and the Palestinian Authority", no agreement was reached. Also, intra-Palestinian reconciliation talks stalled and, as a result, during Obama's visit to Israel, Hamas launched five rocket strikes on Israel. In November, Isra Almodallal was appointed the first spokeswoman of the group.

2014 Israel–Gaza conflict

On July 8, 2014 Israel launched Operation Protective Edge to counter increased Hamas rocket fire from Gaza. The conflict ended with a permanent cease-fire after 7 weeks, and more than 2,200 dead. 64 of the dead were Israeli soldiers, 7 were civilians in Israel (from rocket attacks), and 2,101 were killed in Gaza, of which according to UN OCHA at least 1,460 were civilians. Israel says 1,000 of the dead were militants. Following the conflict, Mahmoud Abbas president of the Palestinian Authority, accused Hamas of needlessly extending the fighting in the Gaza Strip, contributing to the high death toll, of running a "shadow government" in Gaza, and of illegally executing scores of Palestinians. Hamas has complained about the slow delivery of reconstruction materials after the conflict and announced that they were diverting these materials from civilian uses to build more infiltration tunnels.

Reconciliation attempts

In 2016, Hamas began security co-ordination with Egypt to crack down on Islamic terrorist organizations in Sinai, in return for economic aid.

In May 2017, Hamas unveiled its new charter, in an attempt to moderate its image. The charter no longer calls for Israel's destruction, but still calls for liberation of Palestine and to 'confront the Zionist project'. It also confirms acceptance of the 1967 borders as the basis for establishing a Palestinian state as well as not being an offshoot of the Muslim Brotherhood.

In October 2017, Fatah and Hamas signed yet another reconciliation agreement. The partial agreement addresses civil and administrative matters involving Gaza and the West Bank. Other contentious issues such as national elections, reform of the Palestine Liberation Organization (PLO) and possible demilitarization of Hamas were to be discussed in the next meeting in November 2017, due to a new step-by-step approach.

2018–2019 Gaza border protests

Between 2018 and 2019, Hamas participated in "the Great March of Return" along the Gaza border with Israel. At least 183 Palestinians were killed.

2021 Israel–Palestine crisis

In May 2021, after tensions escalated in Sheikh Jarrah and the al-Aqsa mosque compound in Jerusalem, Israel and Hamas clashed in Gaza once again. After eleven days of fighting, at least 243 people were killed in Gaza and 12 in Israel.

Media

Al-Aqsa TV 

Al-Aqsa TV is a television channel founded by Hamas. The station began broadcasting in the Gaza Strip on January 9, 2006, less than three weeks before the Palestinian legislative elections. It has shown television programs, including some children's television, which deliver anti-semitic messages. Hamas has stated that the television station is "an independent media institution that often does not express the views of the Palestinian government headed by Ismail Haniyeh or of the Hamas movement," and that Hamas does not hold anti-semitic views. The programming includes ideologically tinged children's shows, news talk, and religiously inspired entertainment. According to the Anti-Defamation League, the station promotes terrorist activity and incites hatred of Jews and Israelis. Al-Aqsa TV is headed by Fathi Ahmad Hammad, chairman of al-Ribat Communications and Artistic Productions—a Hamas-run company that also produces Hamas's radio station, Voice of al-Aqsa, and its biweekly newspaper, The Message.

Children's magazine 

Al-Fateh ("the conqueror") is the Hamas children's magazine, published biweekly in London, and also posted in an online website. It began publication in September 2002, and its 108th issue was released in mid-September 2007. The magazine features stories, poems, riddles, and puzzles, and states it is for "the young builders of the future".

According to the Anti-Defamation League, al-Fateh promotes violence and anti-semitism, with praise for and encouragement to become suicide bombers, and that it "regularly includes photos of children it claims have been detained, injured or killed by Israeli police, images of children firing slingshots or throwing rocks at Israelis and children holding automatic weapons and firebombs."

Hamas Charter (1988)

The foundational document of Hamas, the Hamas Charter (mīthāq ḥarakat), was, according to Khaled Hroub written by a single individual and made public without going through the usual prior consultation process.  It was then signed on August 18, 1988. It contains both antisemitic passages and characterizations of Israeli society as Nazi-like in its cruelty, and irredentist claims. It declares all of Palestine a waqf, an unalienable religious property consisting of land endowed to Muslims in perpetuity by God, with religious coexistence under Islam's rule. The charter rejects a two-state solution, stating that the conflict cannot be resolved "except through jihad".

Article 6 states that the movement's aim is to "raise the banner of Allah over every inch of Palestine, for under the wing of Islam followers of all religions can coexist in security and safety where their lives, possessions and rights are concerned". It adds that, "when our enemies usurp some Islamic lands, jihad becomes a duty binding on all Muslims", for which the whole of the land is non-negotiable, a position likened, without the racist sentiments present in the Hamas charter, to that in the Likud party platform and in movements like Gush Emunim. For Hamas, to concede territory is seen as equivalent to renouncing Islam itself.

Decades down the line, Hamas's official position changed with regard to a two-state solution. Khaled Mashaal, its leader, has publicly affirmed the movement's readiness to accept such a division. When Hamas won a majority in the 2006 Palestinian legislative election, Haniyeh, then president-elect, sent messages to both George Bush and Israel's leaders asking to be recognized and offering a long-term truce (hudna), along the 1967 border lines. No response was forthcoming.

Mousa Marzook said in 2007 that the charter could not be altered because it would look like a compromise not acceptable to the 'street' and risk fracturing the party's unity. Hamas leader Khaled Meshaal has stated that the Charter is "a piece of history and no longer relevant, but cannot be changed for internal reasons". Ahmed Yousef, senior adviser to Ismail Haniyeh, added in 2011 that it reflected the views of the Elders in the face of a 'relentless occupation.' The details of its religious and political language had not been examined within the framework of international law, and an internal committee review to amend it was shelved out of concern not to offer concessions to Israel, as had Fatah, on a silver platter. While Hamas representatives recognize the problem, one official notes that Arafat got very little in return for changing the PLO Charter under the Oslo Accords, and that there is agreement that little is gained from a non-violent approach. Richard Davis says the dismissal by contemporary leaders of its relevance and yet the suspension of a desire to rewrite it reflects the differing constituencies Hamas must address, the domestic audience and international relations. The charter itself is considered an 'historical relic.'

In March 2006, Hamas released its official legislative program. The document clearly signaled that Hamas could refer the issue of recognizing Israel to a national referendum. Under the heading "Recognition of Israel," it stated simply (AFP, 3/11/06): "The question of recognizing Israel is not the jurisdiction of one faction, nor the government, but a decision for the Palestinian people." This was a major shift away from their 1988 charter. A few months later, via University of Maryland's Jerome Segal, the group sent a letter to U.S. President George W. Bush stating they "don't mind having a Palestinian state in the 1967 borders", and asked for direct negotiations: "Segal emphasized that a state within the 1967 borders and a truce for many years could be considered Hamas's de facto recognition of Israel."

In an April 2008 meeting between Hamas leader Khaled Mashal and former U.S. President Jimmy Carter, an understanding was reached in which Hamas agreed it would respect the creation of a Palestinian state in the territory seized by Israel in the 1967 Six-Day War, provided this were ratified by the Palestinian people in a referendum. Hamas later publicly offered a long-term truce with Israel if Israel agreed to return to its 1967 borders and grant the "right of return" to all Palestinian refugees. In November 2008, Hamas leader Ismail Haniyeh re-stated that Hamas was willing to accept a Palestinian state within the 1967 borders, and offered Israel a long-term truce "if Israel recognized the Palestinians' national rights". In 2009, in a letter to UN Secretary General Ban Ki-moon, Haniyeh repeated his group's support for a two-state settlement based on 1967 borders: "We would never thwart efforts to create an independent Palestinian state with borders [from] June 4, 1967, with Jerusalem as its capital." On December 1, 2010, Ismail Haniyeh again repeated, "We accept a Palestinian state on the borders of 1967, with Jerusalem as its capital, the release of Palestinian prisoners, and the resolution of the issue of refugees," and "Hamas will respect the results [of a referendum] regardless of whether it differs with its ideology and principles."

In February 2012, according to the Palestinian authority, Hamas forswore the use of violence. Evidence for this was provided by an eruption of violence from Islamic Jihad in March 2012 after an Israeli assassination of a Jihad leader, during which Hamas refrained from attacking Israel. "Israel—despite its mantra that because Hamas is sovereign in Gaza it is responsible for what goes on there—almost seems to understand," wrote Israeli journalists Avi Issacharoff and Amos Harel, "and has not bombed Hamas offices or installations".

Israel has rejected some truce offers by Hamas because it contends the group uses them to prepare for more fighting rather than peace. The Atlantic magazine columnist Jeffrey Goldberg, along with other analysts, believes Hamas may be incapable of permanent reconciliation with Israel. Mkhaimer Abusada, a political scientist at Al Azhar University, writes that Hamas talks "of hudna [temporary ceasefire], not of peace or reconciliation with Israel. They believe over time they will be strong enough to liberate all historic Palestine."

Islamization efforts

In the Gaza Strip

The gender ideology outlined in the Hamas charter, the importance of women in the religious-nationalist project of liberation is asserted as no lesser than that of males. Their role was defined primarily as one of manufacturing males and caring for their upbringing and rearing, though the charter recognized they could fight for liberation without obtaining their husband's permission and in 2002 their participation in jihad was permitted. The doctrinal emphasis on childbearing and rearing as woman's primary duty is not so different from Fatah's view of women in the First Intifada and it also resembles the outlook of Jewish settlers, and over time it has been subjected to change.

In 1989, during the First Intifada, a small number of Hamas followers campaigned for the wearing of the hijab, which is not a part of traditional women's attire in Palestine, for polygamy, and also insisted women stay at home and be segregated from men. In the course of this campaign, women who chose not to wear the hijab were verbally and physically harassed, with the result that the hijab was being worn 'just to avoid problems on the streets'. The harassment dropped drastically when, after 18 months UNLU condemned it, though similar campaigns reoccurred.

Since Hamas took control of the Gaza Strip in 2007, some of its members have attempted to impose Islamic dress or the hijab head covering on women. Also, the government's "Islamic Endowment Ministry" has deployed Virtue Committee members to warn citizens of the dangers of immodest dress, card playing, and dating. However, there are no government laws imposing dress and other moral standards, and the Hamas education ministry reversed one effort to impose Islamic dress on students. There has also been successful resistance to attempts by local Hamas officials to impose Islamic dress on women.

Hamas officials deny having any plans to impose Islamic law, one legislator stating that "What you are seeing are incidents, not policy," and that Islamic law is the desired standard "but we believe in persuasion". The Hamas education ministry reversed one effort to impose Islamic dress on students. When the BBC in 2010 interviewed five "middle-class" women in Gaza City, the subjects generally indicated Hamas attempts to enforce conservative religious standards of dress had been largely rejected by the local population, with some expressing concern that the closure of Gaza would allow the proliferation of extremist enforcement attempts by low-level Hamas officials, and others indicating they were happy to see Hamas enforcing such requirements. They also cited examples of leniency by Hamas authorities, such as allowing widowed women to keep custody of their children so long as they did not remarry, and other relaxations in the enforcement of Shariah law. One woman noted that the environment was "not as bad" as during the First Intifada, when women were subject to public criticism and stonings for failure to obey conservative Islamic standards of dress. One woman complained that women were not free to speak their minds or travel alone, and added: "Hamas want to force themselves onto the people. They want the people to submit to them, this is their cover. They destroyed the reputation of Islam, by saying we're doing this because it is religion. This is how they won the elections."

In 2013, UNRWA canceled its annual marathon in Gaza after Hamas rulers prohibited women from participating in the race.

In the West Bank
In 2005, the human rights organization Freemuse released a report titled "Palestine: Taliban-like attempts to censor music", which said that Palestinian musicians feared that harsh religious laws against music and concerts will be imposed since Hamas group scored political gains in the Palestinian Authority local elections of 2005.

The attempt by Hamas to dictate a cultural code of conduct in the 1980s and early 1990s led to a violent fighting between different Palestinian sectors. Hamas members reportedly burned down stores that stocked videos they deemed indecent and destroyed books they described as "heretical".

In 2005, an outdoor music and dance performance in Qalqiliya were suddenly banned by the Hamas led municipality, for the reason that such an event would be forbidden by Islam, or "Haram". The municipality also ordered that music no longer be played in the Qalqiliya zoo, and mufti Akrameh Sabri issued a religious edict affirming the municipality decision. In response, the Palestinian national poet Mahmoud Darwish warned that "There are Taliban-type elements in our society, and this is a very dangerous sign."

The Palestinian columnist Mohammed Abd Al-Hamid, a resident of Ramallah, wrote that this religious coercion could cause the migration of artists, and said "The religious fanatics in Algeria destroyed every cultural symbol, shattered statues and rare works of art and liquidated intellectuals and artists, reporters and authors, ballet dancers and singers—are we going to imitate the Algerian and Afghani examples?"

Erdoğan's Turkey as a role model
Some Hamas members stated that the model of Islamic government that Hamas seeks to emulate is that of Turkey under the rule of Recep Tayyip Erdoğan. The foremost members to distance Hamas from the practices of Taliban and to publicly support the Erdoğan model were Ahmed Yousef and Ghazi Hamad, advisers to Prime Minister Hanieh. Yusuf, the Hamas deputy foreign minister, reflected this goal in an interview to a Turkish newspaper, stating that while foreign public opinion equates Hamas with the Taliban or al-Qaeda, the analogy is inaccurate. Yusuf described the Taliban as "opposed to everything", including education and women's rights, while Hamas wants to establish good relations between the religious and secular elements of society and strives for human rights, democracy and an open society. According to professor Yezid Sayigh of the King's College in London, how influential this view is within Hamas is uncertain, since both Ahmad Yousef and Ghazi Hamad were dismissed from their posts as advisers to Hamas Prime Minister Ismail Hanieh in October 2007. Both have since been appointed to other prominent positions within the Hamas government. Khaled al-Hroub of the West Bank-based and anti-Hamas Palestinian daily Al Ayyam added that despite claims by Hamas leaders that it wants to repeat the Turkish model of Islam, "what is happening on the ground in reality is a replica of the Taliban model of Islam."

Antisemitism and anti-Zionism

According to academic Esther Webman, antisemitism is not the main tenet of Hamas ideology, although antisemitic rhetoric is frequent and intense in Hamas leaflets. The leaflets generally do not differentiate between Jews and Zionists. In other Hamas publications and interviews with its leaders, attempts at this differentiation have been made. In 2009 representatives of the small anti-Zionist Jewish group Neturei Karta met with Hamas leader Ismail Haniyeh in Gaza, who stated that he held nothing against Jews but only against the state of Israel.

Hamas has made conflicting statements about its readiness to recognize Israel. In 2006 a spokesman signaled readiness to recognize Israel within the 1967 borders. Speaking of requests for Hamas to recognize agreements between the Palestinian Authority and Israel, senior Hamas member Khaled Suleiman said that "these agreements are a reality which we view as such, and therefore I see no problem." Also in 2006, a Hamas official ruled out recognition of Israel with reference to West and East Germany, which never recognized each other.

Hamas Charter

 Article 7 of the Hamas Covenant provides the following quotation, attributed to Muhammad:

The Day of Judgement will not come about until Moslems fight the Jews (killing the Jews), when the Jew will hide behind stones and trees. The stones and trees will say O Moslems, O Abdulla, there is a Jew behind me, come and kill him. Only the Gharkad tree (evidently a certain kind of tree), would not do that because it is one of the trees of the Jews.

Multiple commentators, including Jeffrey Goldberg and Philip Gourevitch, have identified this passage as incitement to genocide.
 Article 22 states that the French Revolution, the Russian Revolution, colonialism and both world wars were created by the Zionists or forces supportive of Zionism:

You may speak as much as you want about regional and world wars. They were behind World War I, when they were able to destroy the Islamic Caliphate, making financial gains and controlling resources. They obtained the Balfour Declaration, formed the League of Nations through which they could rule the world. They were behind World War II, through which they made huge financial gains by trading in armaments, and paved the way for the establishment of their state. It was they who instigated the replacement of the League of Nations with the United Nations and the Security Council to enable them to rule the world through them. There is no war going on anywhere, without having their finger in it.
 Article 32 of the Covenant refers to an antisemitic forgery, The Protocols of the Elders of Zion:

Today it is Palestine, tomorrow it will be one country or another. The Zionist plan is limitless. After Palestine, the Zionists aspire to expand from the Nile to the Euphrates. When they will have digested the region they overtook, they will aspire to further expansion, and so on. Their plan is embodied in The Protocols of the Elders of Zion, and their present conduct is the best proof of what we are saying.

Statements by Hamas members and clerics

Statements to an Arab audience
In 2008, Imam Yousif al-Zahar of Hamas said in his sermon at the Katib Wilayat mosque in Gaza that "Jews are a people who cannot be trusted. They have been traitors to all agreements. Go back to history. Their fate is their vanishing."

Another Hamas legislator and imam, Sheik Yunus al-Astal, discussed a Koranic verse suggesting that "suffering by fire is the Jews' destiny in this world and the next." He concluded "Therefore we are sure that the Holocaust is still to come upon the Jews."

Following the rededication of the Hurva Synagogue in Jerusalem in March 2010, senior Hamas figure al-Zahar called on Palestinians everywhere to observe five minutes of silence "for Israel's disappearance and to identify with Jerusalem and the al-Aqsa mosque". He further stated that "Wherever you have been you've been sent to your destruction. You've killed and murdered your prophets and you have always dealt in loan-sharking and destruction. You've made a deal with the devil and with destruction itself—just like your synagogue."

On August 10, 2012, Ahmad Bahr, Deputy Speaker of the Hamas Parliament, stated in a sermon that aired on Al-Aqsa TV:

If the enemy sets foot on a single square inch of Islamic land, Jihad becomes an individual duty, incumbent on every Muslim, male or female. A woman may set out [on Jihad] without her husband's permission, and a servant without his master's permission. Why? In order to annihilate those Jews. ... O Allah, destroy the Jews and their supporters. O Allah, destroy the Americans and their supporters. O Allah, count them one by one, and kill them all, without leaving a single one.Hamas leader prays for annihilation of Jews, Americans by Greg Tepper, The Times of Israel, August 20, 2012.Hamas top official: Kill every last Jew and American (video), Jewish Journal, August 24, 2012.

In an interview with Al-Aqsa TV on September 12, 2012, Marwan Abu Ras, a Hamas MP, who is also a member of the International Union of Muslim Scholars, stated (as translated by MEMRI):

On December 26, 2012, Senior Hamas official and Jerusalem bureau chief Ahmed Abu Haliba, called on "all Palestinian factions to resume suicide attacks ... deep inside the Zionist enemy" and said that "we must renew the resistance to occupation in any possible way, above all through armed resistance." Abu Haliba suggested the use of suicide bombings as a response to Israel's plans to build housing units in East Jerusalem and the West Bank.

In an interview on Lebanese television on July 28, 2014, Hamas spokesman Osama Hamdan repeated the blood libel myth:

Statements an international audience
In an interview with CBS This Morning on July 27, 2014, Hamas leader Khaled Meshaal stated:

On January 8, 2012, during a visit to Tunis, Gazan Hamas PM Ismail Haniyeh told The Associated Press that he disagrees with the anti-Semitic slogans. "We are not against the Jews because they are Jews. Our problem is with those occupying the land of Palestine," he said. "There are Jews all over the world, but Hamas does not target them." In response to a statement by Palestinian Authority leader Mahmoud Abbas that Hamas preferred non-violent means and had agreed to adopt "peaceful resistance," Hamas contradicted Abbas. According to Hamas spokesman Sami Abu-Zuhri, "We had agreed to give popular resistance precedence in the West Bank, but this does not come at the expense of armed resistance."

In May 2009, senior Hamas MP Sayed Abu Musameh said, "in our culture, we respect every foreigner, especially Jews and Christians, but we are against Zionists, not as nationalists but as fascists and racists." In the same interview, he also said, "I hate all kinds of weapons. I dream of seeing every weapon from the atomic bomb to small guns banned everywhere." In January 2009, Gazan Hamas Health Minister Basim Naim published a letter in The Guardian, stating that Hamas has no quarrel with Jewish people, only with the actions of Israel. In October 1994, in a response to Israel's crackdown on Hamas militants following a suicide bombing on a Tel Aviv bus, Hamas promised retaliation: "Rabin must know that Hamas loves death more than Rabin and his soldiers love life."

Statements on the Holocaust
Hamas has been explicit in its Holocaust denial. In reaction to the Stockholm conference on the Jewish Holocaust, held in late January 2000, Hamas issued a press release that it published on its official website, containing the following statements from a senior leader:

This conference bears a clear Zionist goal, aimed at forging history by hiding the truth about the so-called Holocaust, which is an alleged and invented story with no basis. (...) The invention of these grand illusions of an alleged crime that never occurred, ignoring the millions of dead European victims of Nazism during the war, clearly reveals the racist Zionist face, which believes in the superiority of the Jewish race over the rest of the nations. (...) By these methods, the Jews in the world flout scientific methods of research whenever that research contradicts their racist interests.

In August 2003, senior Hamas official Dr Abd Al-Aziz Al-Rantisi wrote in the Hamas newspaper Al-Risala that the Zionists encouraged murder of Jews by the Nazis with the aim of forcing them to immigrate to Palestine.

In 2005, Khaled Mashal called Mahmoud Ahmadinejad's December 14, 2005 statements on the Holocaust that Europeans had "created a myth in the name of Holocaust") as "courageous". Later in 2008, Basim Naim, the minister of health in the Hamas-led Palestinian Authority government in Gaza countered holocaust denial, and said "it should be made clear that neither Hamas nor the Palestinian government in Gaza denies the Nazi Holocaust. The Holocaust was not only a crime against humanity but one of the most abhorrent crimes in modern history. We condemn it as we condemn every abuse of humanity and all forms of discrimination on the basis of religion, race, gender or nationality."

In an open letter to Gaza Strip UNRWA chief John Ging published August 20, 2009, the movement's Popular Committees for Refugees called the Holocaust "a lie invented by the Zionists," adding that the group refused to let Gazan children study it. Hamas leader Yunis al-Astal continued by saying that having the Holocaust included in the UNRWA curriculum for Gaza students amounted to "marketing a lie and spreading it". Al-Astal continued "I do not exaggerate when I say this issue is a war crime, because of how it serves the Zionist colonizers and deals with their hypocrisy and lies."

In February 2011, Hamas voiced opposition to UNRWA's teaching of the Holocaust in Gaza. According to Hamas, "Holocaust studies in refugee camps is a contemptible plot and serves the Zionist entity with a goal of creating a reality and telling stories in order to justify acts of slaughter against the Palestinian people." In July 2012, Fawzi Barhoum, a Hamas spokesman, denounced a visit by Ziad al-Bandak, an adviser to Palestinian Authority President Mahmoud Abbas, to the Auschwitz death camp, saying it was "unjustified" and "unhelpful" and only served the "Zionist occupation" while coming "at the expense of a real Palestinian tragedy". He also called the Holocaust an "alleged tragedy" and "exaggerated". In October 2012, Hamas said that they were opposed to teaching about the Holocaust in Gaza Strip schools run by the UN Relief and Works Agency. The Refugee Affairs Department of Hamas said that teaching the Holocaust was a "crime against the issue of the refugees that is aimed at canceling their right of return".

Violence and terrorism

Hamas has used both political activities and violence in pursuit of its goals. For example, while politically engaged in the 2006 Palestinian Territories parliamentary election campaign, Hamas stated in its election manifesto that it was prepared to use "armed resistance to end the occupation".

From 2000 to 2004, Hamas was responsible for killing nearly 400 Israelis and wounding more than 2,000 in 425 attacks, according to the Israeli Ministry of Foreign Affairs. From 2001 through May 2008, Hamas launched more than 3,000 Qassam rockets and 2,500 mortar attacks into Israel.

Attacks on civilians

Hamas has attacked Israeli civilians. Hamas's most deadly suicide bombing was an attack on a Netanya hotel on March 27, 2002, in which 30 people were killed and 140 were wounded. The attack has also been referred to as the Passover massacre since it took place on the first night of the Jewish festival of Passover at a Seder.

Hamas has defended suicide attacks as a legitimate aspect of its asymmetric warfare against Israel. In 2003, according to Stephen Atkins, Hamas resumed suicide bombings in Israel as a retaliatory measure after the failure of peace talks and an Israeli campaign targeting members of the upper echelon of the Hamas leadership. but they are considered as crimes against humanity under international law. In a 2002 report, Human Rights Watch stated that Hamas leaders "should be held accountable" for "war crimes and crimes against humanity" committed by the al-Qassam Brigades.

In May 2006, Israel arrested a top Hamas official, Ibrahim Hamed, who Israeli security officials alleged was responsible for dozens of suicide bombings and other attacks on Israelis. Hamed's trial on those charges has not yet concluded. In 2008, Hamas explosives engineer Shihab al-Natsheh organized a deadly suicide bombing in Dimona.

Since 2002, paramilitary soldiers of al-Qassam Brigades and other groups have used homemade Qassam rockets to hit Israeli towns in the Negev, such as Sderot. Al-Qassam Brigades was estimated in 2007 to have launched 22% of the rocket and mortar attacks, which killed fifteen people between the years 2000 and 2009 (see Palestinian rocket attacks on Israel). The introduction of the Qassam-2 rocket in 2008 enabled Palestinian paramilitary groups to reach, from Gaza, such Israeli cities such as Ashkelon.

In 2008, Hamas leader Khaled Mashal, offered that Hamas would attack only military targets if the IDF would stop causing the deaths of Palestinian civilians. Following a June 19, 2008 ceasefire, the al-Qassam Brigades ended its rocket attacks and arrested Fatah militants in Gaza who had continued sporadic rocket and mortar attacks against Israel. The al-Qassam Brigades resumed the attacks after the November 4 Israeli incursion into Gaza.

On June 15, 2014, Israeli Prime Minister Benjamin Netanyahu accused Hamas of involvement in the kidnapping of three Israeli teenagers (including one who held American citizenship), saying "This has severe repercussions." On July 20, 2014, nearly two weeks into Operation Protective Edge, Netanyahu in an interview with CNN described Hamas as "genocidal terrorists."

On August 5, 2014 Israel announced that Israeli security forces arrested Hussam Kawasme, in Shuafat, in connection with the murders. During interrogation, Kawasme admitted to being the mastermind behind the attack, in addition to securing the funding from Hamas. Officials have stated that additional people arrested in connection with the murders are still being held, but no names have been released.

On August 20, Saleh al-Arouri, a Hamas leader in exile in Turkey, claimed responsibility for the kidnapping of the three Israeli teens. He delivered an address on behalf of Khaled Mashal at the conference of the International Union of Muslim Scholars in Istanbul, a move that might reflect a desire by Hamas to gain leverage. In it he said: "Our goal was to ignite an intifada in the West Bank and Jerusalem, as well as within the 1948 borders. ... Your brothers in the Al-Qassam Brigades carried out this operation to support their imprisoned brothers, who were on a hunger strike. ... The mujahideen captured these settlers in order to have a swap deal." Hamas political leader Khaled Mashal accepted that members of Hamas were responsible, stating that he knew nothing of it in advance and that what the leadership knew of the details came from reading Israeli reports. Meshaal, who has headed Hamas's exiled political wing since 2004, has denied being involved in the "details" of Hamas "military issues", but "justified the killings as a legitimate action against Israelis on "occupied" lands."

Hamas suicide attacks on Israeli civilians have largely disappeared since 2005; this has coincided with an increase in rocket attacks. One analysis suggests that the decline in suicide attacks is not motivated by any lack of supplies or volunteers to carry out such operations, by enhanced Israeli security measures such as the West Bank barrier (if Israeli actions were the reason, one would expect to see an equal decline in suicide attacks by all Palestinian factions, which is not observed), or by a newfound desire for reconciliation with Israel on the part of Hamas. Rather, suicide bombings provoked targeted killings that decimated the leadership of Hamas, whereas rocket attacks have elicited weaker Israeli reprisals that have tended to harm the Palestinian population as a whole more than Hamas (such as the blockade of the Gaza Strip)—thereby paradoxically increasing Hamas's popular support.

Rocket attacks on Israel
Rocket attacks by Hamas have been condemned by human rights organizations as war crimes, both because they usually take aim at civilians and because the weapons' inaccuracy would disproportionately endanger civilians even if military targets were chosen. After Operation Pillar of Defense, Human Rights Watch stated that armed Palestinian groups fired hundreds of rockets at Israeli cities, violating international humanitarian law, and that statements by Palestinian groups that they deliberately targeted Israeli civilians demonstrated an "intent to commit war crimes". HRW's Middle East director Sarah Leah Whitson said that Palestinian groups made clear that "harming civilians was their aim" and said that launching rockets at populated areas had no legal justification. International humanitarian law prohibits deliberate attacks on civilians and intentional violations can be war crimes.

According to Human Rights Watch, Hamas and other Palestinian armed groups have launched thousands of rockets into Israel since 2001, killing 15 civilians, wounding many more, and posing an ongoing threat to the nearly 800,000 Israeli civilians who live and work in the weapons' range. Hamas officials have said that the rockets were aimed only at military targets, saying that civilian casualties were the "accidental result" of the weapons' poor quality. According to Human Rights Watch, statements by Hamas leaders suggest that the purpose of the rocket attacks was indeed to strike civilians and civilian objects. From January 2009, following Operation Cast Lead, Hamas largely stopped launching rocket attacks on Israel and has on at least two occasions arrested members of other groups who have launched rockets, "showing that it has the ability to impose the law when it wants". In February 2010, Hamas issued a statement regretting any harm that may have befallen Israeli civilians as a result of Palestinian rocket attacks during the Gaza war. It maintained that its rocket attacks had been aimed at Israeli military targets but lacked accuracy and hence sometimes hit civilian areas. Israel responded that Hamas had boasted repeatedly of targeting and murdering civilians in the media.

According to one report, commenting on the 2014 conflict, "nearly all the 2,500–3,000 rockets and mortars Hamas has fired at Israel since the start of the war seem to have been aimed at towns", including an attack on "a kibbutz collective farm close to the Gaza border", in which an Israeli child was killed. Former Israeli Lt. Col. Jonathan D. Halevi stated that "Hamas has expressed pride in aiming long-range rockets at strategic targets in Israel including the nuclear reactor in Dimona, the chemical plants in Haifa, and Ben-Gurion Airport", which "could have caused thousands" of Israeli casualties "if successful".

In July 2008, Barack Obama, then the Democratic presidential candidate, said: "If somebody was sending rockets into my house, where my two daughters sleep at night, I'm going to do everything in my power to stop that, and I would expect Israelis to do the same thing." On December 28, 2008, Secretary of State Condoleezza Rice said in a statement: "the United States strongly condemns the repeated rocket and mortar attacks against Israel." On March 2, 2009, Secretary of State Hillary Clinton condemned the attacks.

Attempts to derail 2010 peace talks

In 2010, Hamas, who have been actively sidelined from the peace talks by Israel, spearheaded a coordinated effort by 13 Palestinian militant groups, in attempt to derail the stalled peace talks between Israel and Mahmoud Abbas, President of the Palestinian Authority. According to the Israeli Coordinator of Government Activities in the Territories Major Gen. Eitan Dangot, Israel seeks to work with Salam Fayyad, to help revive the Palestinian economy, and hopes to ease restrictions on the Gaza Strip further, "while somehow preventing the Islamic militants who rule it from getting credit for any progress". According to Dangot, Hamas must not be seen as ruling successfully or be allowed to "get credit for a policy that would improve the lives of people". The campaign consists of attacks against Israelis in which, according to a Hamas declaration in early September, "all options are open". The participating groups also include Palestinian Islamic Jihad, the Popular Resistance Committees and an unnamed splinter group of Fatah.

As part of the campaign, on August 31, 2010, 4 Israeli settlers, including a pregnant woman, were killed by Hamas militants while driving on Route 60 near the settlement Kiryat Arba, in the West bank. According to witnesses, militants opened fire on the moving vehicle, but then "approached the car" and shot the occupants in their seats at "close range". The attack was described by Israeli sources as one of the "worst" terrorist acts in years. A senior Hamas official said that Israeli settlers in the West Bank are legitimate targets since "they are an army in every sense of the word".

Themes of martyrdom

According to a translation by Palestinian Media Watch, in 2008, Fathi Hamad, a member of the Palestinian Legislative Council, stated on Al-Aqsa TV, "For the Palestinian people death became an industry, at which women excel and so do all people on this land: the elderly excel, the Jihad fighters excel, and the children excel. Accordingly (Palestinians) created a human shield of women, children, the elderly and the Jihad fighters against the Zionist bombing machine, as if they were saying to the Zionist enemy: 'We desire death as you desire life.'"

In 2010, Hamas speaker Ahmad Bahr praised the virtues of martyrdom and Jihad, and said that 2.5 million black-eyed virgins were waiting in the Garden of Eden, which could be entered only by prophets, by the righteous, and by martyrs. He continued by saying that nobody on Earth "will be able to confront the resistance, or to confront the mujahideen, those who worship Allah and seek martyrdom".

Guerrilla warfare

Hamas has made great use of guerrilla tactics in the Gaza Strip and to a lesser degree the West Bank. It has successfully adapted these techniques over the years since its inception. According to a 2006 report by rival Fatah party, Hamas had smuggled between several hundred and 1,300 tons of advanced rockets, along with other weaponry, into Gaza.

Hamas has used IEDs and anti-tank rockets against the IDF in Gaza. The latter include standard RPG-7 warheads and home-made rockets such as the Al-Bana, Al-Batar and Al-Yasin. The IDF has a difficult, if not impossible time trying to find hidden weapons caches in Palestinian areas—this is due to the high local support base Hamas enjoys.

Extrajudicial killings of rivals
In addition to killing Israeli civilians and armed forces, Hamas has also murdered suspected Palestinian Israel collaborators and Fatah rivals. Hundreds of Palestinians were executed by both Hamas and Fatah during the First Intifada. In the wake of the 2006 Israeli conflict with Gaza, Hamas was accused of systematically rounding up, torturing and summarily executing Fatah supporters suspected of supplying information to Israel. Human Rights Watch estimates several hundred Gazans were "maimed" and tortured in the aftermath of the conflict. Seventy-three Gazan men accused of "collaborating" had their arms and legs broken by "unidentified perpetrators" and 18 Palestinians accused of helping Israel were executed by Hamas security officials in the first days of the conflict. In November 2012, Hamas's Izzedine al-Qassam brigade publicly executed six Gaza residents accused of collaborating with Israel. According to the witnesses, six alleged informers were shot dead one by one in Gaza City, while the corpse of the sixth victim was tied by a cable to the back of a motorcycle and dragged through the streets. In 2013, Human Rights Watch issued a statement condemning Hamas for not investigating and giving a proper trial to the 6 men. Their statement was released the day before Hamas issued a deadline for "collaborators" to turn themselves in, or they will be pursued "without mercy". In August 2014, during the 2014 Israel-Gaza conflict, at least 22 accused collaborators were executed by Hamas shortly after three of its commanders were assassinated by Israeli forces. An Israeli source denied that any of the commanders had been targeted on the basis of human intelligence.

Frequent killings of unarmed people have also occurred during Hamas-Fatah clashes. NGOs have cited a number of summary executions as particular examples of violations of the rules of warfare, including the case of Muhammad Swairki, 28, a cook for Palestinian Authority Chairman Mahmoud Abbas's presidential guard, who was thrown to his death, with his hands and legs tied, from a 15-story apartment building in Gaza City. Hamas security forces reportedly shoot and torture Palestinians who opposed Hamas rule in Gaza. In one case, a Palestinian had criticized Hamas in a conversation on the street with some friends. Later that day, more than a dozen armed men with black masks and red kaffiyeh took the man from his home, and brought him to a solitary area where they shot him three times in the lower legs and ankles. The man told Human Rights Watch that he was not politically active.

On August 14, 2009, Hamas fighters stormed the Mosque of cleric Abdel-Latif Moussa. The cleric was protected by at least 100 fighters from Jund Ansar Allah ("Army of the Helpers of God"), an Islamist group with links to Al-Qaeda. The resulting battle left at least 13 people dead, including Moussa and 6 Hamas fighters, and 120 people injured. According to Palestinian president Mahmoud Abbas, during 2014 Israel–Gaza conflict, Hamas killed more than 120 Palestinian youths for defying house arrest imposed on them by Hamas, in addition to 30–40 Palestinians killed by Hamas in extrajudicial executions after accusing them of being collaborators with Israel. Referring to the killing of suspected collaborators, a Shin Bet official stated that "not even one" of those executed by Hamas provided any intelligence to Israel, while the Shin Bet officially "confirmed that those executed during Operation Protective Edge had all been held in prison in Gaza in the course of the hostilities".

2011–2013 Sinai insurgency

Hamas has been accused of providing weapons, training and fighters for Sinai-based insurgent attacks, although Hamas strongly denies the allegations, calling them a smear campaign aiming to harm relations with Egypt. According to the Egyptian Army, since the ouster of Egypt's Muslim-Brotherhood president Mohamed Morsi, over 600 Hamas members have entered the Sinai Peninsula through smuggling tunnels. In addition, several weapons used in Sinai's insurgent attacks are being traced back to Hamas in the Gaza Strip, according to the army. The four leading insurgent groups in the Sinai have all reportedly maintained close ties with the Gaza Strip. Hamas is also accused of helping Morsi and other high-ranking Egyptian Muslim Brotherhood members break out of the Wadi Natroun prison in Cairo during the 2011 revolution. Hamas called the accusation a "dangerous development". Egyptian authorities stated that the 2011 Alexandria bombing was carried out by the Gaza-based Army of Islam, which has received sanctuary from Hamas and earlier collaborated in the capture of Gilad Shalit. Army of Islam members linked to the August 2012 Sinai attack have reportedly sought refuge in the Gaza Strip. Egypt stated that Hamas directly provided logistical support to the Muslim Brotherhood militants who carried out the December 2013 Mansoura bombing.

Terrorist designation 
The United States designated Hamas as a terrorist organisation in 1995, as did Canada in November 2002, and the United Kingdom in November 2021. The European Union designated Hamas's military wing in 2001 and, under US pressure, designated Hamas in 2003. Hamas challenged this decision, which was upheld by the European Court of Justice in July 2017. Japan and New Zealand, have designated the military wing of Hamas as a terrorist organization. The organization is banned in Jordan.

Hamas is not regarded as a terrorist organization by Iran, Russia, Norway, Switzerland, Turkey, China, Egypt, Syria, and Brazil.

According to Tobias Buck, Hamas is "listed as a terrorist organisation by Israel, the US and the EU, but few dare to treat it that way now" and in the Arab and Muslim world it has lost its pariah status and its emissaries are welcomed in capitals of Islamic countries. While Hamas is considered a terrorist group by several governments and some academics, others regard Hamas as a complex organization, with terrorism as only one component.

Criticism

United States 
The FBI and United States Department of Justice also stated, in 2004, that Hamas threatened the United States through covert cells on U.S. soil. Researcher Steven Emerson in 2006 alleged that the group had "an extensive infrastructure in the U.S. mostly revolving around the activities of fundraising, recruiting and training members, directing operations against Israel, organizing political support and operating through human-rights front groups". Emerson added that while the group had never acted outside of Israel or the Palestinian Territories, it does have the capacity to carry out attacks in the U.S. "if it decided to enlarge the scope of its operations". FBI director Robert Mueller in 2005 testified to the Senate Intelligence Committee that, the FBI's assessment at that time was that there was "a limited threat of a coordinated terrorist attack in the US from Palestinian terrorist organizations" such as Hamas. He added that Hamas had "maintained a longstanding policy of focusing their attacks on Israeli targets in Israel and the Palestinian territories", and that the FBI believed that the main interest of Hamas in the U.S. remained "the raising of funds to support their regional goals". Mueller also stated, "of all the Palestinian groups, Hamas has the largest presence in the US, with a robust infrastructure, primarily focused on fundraising, propaganda for the Palestinian cause, and proselytizing." Although it would be a major strategic shift for Hamas, its United States network is theoretically capable of facilitating acts of terrorism in the U.S.

On May 2, 2011, Hamas leader and Prime Minister Ismail Haniyeh condemned the killing of Osama bin Laden in Pakistan by the United States. Haniyeh praised Bin Laden, the founder of the jihadist organization al-Qaeda, as a "martyr" and an "Arab holy warrior". The United States government condemned his remarks as "outrageous". Hamas has reportedly maintained operational and financial ties with al Qaeda.

Human shields

After Operation Pillar of Defense, Human Rights Watch stated that Palestinian groups had endangered civilians by "repeatedly fired rockets from densely populated areas, near homes, businesses, and a hotel" and noted that under international law, parties to a conflict may not place military targets in or near densely populated areas. One rocket was launched close to the Shawa and Housari Building, where various Palestinian and international media have offices; another was fired from the yard of a house near the Deira Hotel. The New York Times journalist Steven Erlanger reported that "Hamas rocket and weapons caches, including rocket launchers, have been discovered in and under mosques, schools and civilian homes." Another report published by Intelligence and Terrorism Information Center revealed that Hamas used close to 100 mosques to store weapons and as launch-pads to shoot rockets. The report contains testimony from variety Palestinian sources, including a Hamas militant Sabhi Majad Atar, who said he was taught how to shoot rockets from inside a mosque. Hamas has also been criticized by Israeli officials for blending into or hiding among the Palestinian civilian population during the 2008–2009 Israel–Gaza conflict. The Israeli government published what it said was video evidence of human shield tactics by Hamas. Israel said that Hamas frequently used mosques and school yards as hideouts and places to store weapons, and that Hamas militants stored weapons in their homes, making it difficult to ensure that civilians close to legitimate military targets are not hurt during Israeli military operations. Israeli officials also accused the Hamas leadership of hiding under Shifa Hospital during the conflict, using the patients inside to deter an Israeli attack.

The Israeli government filed a report entitled "Gaza Operations Investigation: Second Update" to the United Nations accusing Hamas of exploiting its rules of engagement by shooting rockets and launching attacks within protected civilian areas. Israel says 12,000 rockets and mortars were fired at it between 2000 and 2008—nearly 3,000 in 2008 alone. In one case, an errant Israeli mortar strike killed dozens of people near a UN school. Hamas said that the mortar killed 42 people and left dozens wounded. Israel said that Hamas militants had launched a rocket from a yard adjacent to the school and one mortar of three rounds hit the school, due to a GPS error. According to the Israeli military probe, the remaining two rounds hit the yard used to launch rockets into Israel, killing two members of Hamas's military wing who fired the rockets. Human Rights Watch called Hamas to "publicly renounce" the rocket attacks against Israeli civilians and hold those responsible to account. Human Rights Watch program director Iain Levine said the attacks by Hamas were "unlawful and unjustifiable, and amount to war crimes", and accused Hamas of putting Palestinians at risk by launching attacks from built-up areas. A Hamas spokesman replied that the report was "biased" and denied that Hamas uses human shields.

Human Rights Watch investigated 19 incidents involving 53 civilian deaths in Gaza that Israel said were the result of Hamas fighting in densely populated areas and did not find evidence for existence of Palestinian fighters in the areas at the time of the Israeli attack. In other cases where no civilians had died, the report concluded that Hamas may have deliberately fired rockets from areas close to civilians. HRW also investigated 11 deaths that Israel said were civilians being used as human shields by Hamas. HRW found no evidence that the civilians were used as human shields, nor had they been shot in crossfire. The Israeli 'human shields' charge against Hamas was called "full of holes" by The National (UAE), which stated that only Israel accused Hamas of using human shields during the conflict, though Hamas "may be guilty" of "locating military objectives within or near densely populated areas" and for "deliberately firing indiscriminate weapons into civilian populated areas".

On July 8, 2014, Hamas's spokesman Sami Abu Zuhri encouraged the "policy of people confronting the Israeli warplanes with their bare chests in order to protect their homes", saying it has proven itself. According to the Israel Defense Forces blog, soldiers recounted "Suddenly, a small boy appeared, and the terrorist grabbed him and escaped with him"; "I saw with my own eyes someone using another person, a woman, as a shield. ... And I can see very clearly that the woman doesn't want to be there and he's pulling her with him"; and "We even found explosives in nurseries. The whole neighborhood was practically a terrorist base."

Israel has accused Hamas of using children as human shields. The Israeli government released video footage in which it claims two militants are shown grabbing a young boy's arm from behind holding him to walk in front of them toward a group of people waiting near a wall. The IDF argues the militants were placing the boy between themselves and an Israeli sniper. The second scene shows an individual, described as a terrorist, grabbing a school boy off of a floor, where he is hiding behind a column from IDF fire, and using him as a human shield to walk to a different location. After 15 alleged militants sought refuge in a mosque from Israeli forces, the BBC reported that Hamas radio instructed local women to go the mosque to protect the militants. Israeli forces later opened fire and killed two women.

In November 2006, the Israeli Air Force warned Muhammad Weil Baroud, commander of the Popular Resistance Committees who are accused of launching rockets into Israeli territory, to evacuate his home in a Jabalya refugee camp  apartment block in advance of a planned Israeli air strike. Baroud responded by calling for volunteers to protect the apartment block and nearby buildings and, according to The Jerusalem Post, hundreds of local residents, mostly women and children, responded. Israel suspended the air strike. Israel termed the action an example of Hamas using human shields. In response to the incident, Hamas proclaimed: 'We won. From now on we will form human chains around every house threatened with demolition.'" In a November 22 press release, Human Rights Watch condemned Hamas, stating: "There is no excuse for calling civilians to the scene of a planned attack. Whether or not the home is a legitimate military target, knowingly asking civilians to stand in harm's way is unlawful." Following criticism, Human rights Watch issued a statement saying that their initial assessment of the situation was in error. They stated that, on the basis of available evidence, the home demolition was in fact an administrative act, viewed in the context of Israel's longstanding policy of punitive home demolitions, not a military act and thus would not fall within the purview of the law regulating hostilities during armed conflict, which had been the basis for their initial criticism of Hamas.

When the UN-sponsored Goldstone Commission Report on the Gaza War was commissioned in 2009, it stated that it "found no evidence that Palestinian combatants mingled with the civilian population with the intention of shielding themselves from attack" though they deemed credible reports that Palestinian militants were "not always dressed in a way that distinguished them from civilians". Hamas MP Fathi Hamed stated that "For the Palestinian people, death has become an industry, at which women excel...the elderly excel at this...and so do the children. This is why they have formed human shields of the women, the children." Following the release of the Goldstone Report, the former commander of the British forces in Afghanistan Col. Richard Kemp was invited to testify at the UN Human Rights Council 12th Special Session that during Operation Cast Lead Israel encountered an "enemy that deliberately positioned its military capability behind the human shield of the civilian population".

Children as combatants 

In the early intifada period, children in Gaza and the West Bank were instilled by Hamas with Islamic and military values. Evidence from 2001 shows that kindergarten children attended ceremonies where they wore emblematic uniforms and bore mock rifles. Some were dressed up as suicide bombers, whose readiness to die for the cause was held up as a model to be imitated. The preschoolers would swear an oath 'to pursue jihad, resistance and intifada.' At summer camps, alongside qur'anic studies and familiarization with computers, courses were given that included military training.

Although Hamas admits to sponsoring summer schools to train teenagers in handling weapons they condemn attacks by children. Following the deaths of three teenagers during a 2002 attack on Netzarim in central Gaza, Hamas banned attacks by children and "called on the teachers and religious leaders to spread the message of restraint among young boys". Hamas's use of child labor to build tunnels with which to attack Israel has also been criticized, with at least 160 children killed in the tunnels as of 2012.

Political freedoms
 Human rights groups and Gazans have accused the Hamas government in the Gaza Strip of restricting freedom of the press and forcefully suppressing dissent. Both foreign and Palestinian journalists report harassment and other measures taken against them. In September 2007 the Gaza Interior Ministry disbanded the Gaza Strip branch of the pro-Fatah Union of Palestinian Journalists, a move criticized by Reporters without borders. In November of that year the Hamas government arrested a British journalist and for a time canceled all press cards in Gaza. On February 8, 2008, Hamas banned distribution of the pro-Fatah Al-Ayyam newspaper, and closed its offices in the Gaza Strip because it ran a caricature that mocked legislators loyal to Hamas. The Gaza Strip Interior Ministry later issued an arrest warrant for the editor.

More widely, in late August 2007 the group was accused in The Telegraph, a conservative British newspaper, of torturing, detaining, and firing on unarmed protesters who had objected to policies of the Hamas government. Also in late August, Palestinian health officials reported that the Hamas government had been shutting down Gaza clinics in retaliation for doctor strikes. The Hamas government confirmed the "punitive measure against doctors" because, in its view, they had incited other doctors to suspend services and go out on strike. In September 2007 the Hamas government banned public prayers after Fatah supporters began holding worship sessions that quickly escalated into raucous protests against Hamas rule. Government security forces beat several gathering supporters and journalists. In October 2008, the Hamas government announced it would release all political prisoners in custody in Gaza. Several hours after the announcement, 17 Fatah members were released.

On August 2, 2012, the International Federation of Journalists (IFJ) accused Hamas of harassing elected officials belonging to the Palestinian Journalists' Syndicate (PJS) in Gaza. The IFJ said that journalists' leaders in Gaza have faced a campaign of intimidation, as well as threats designed to force them to stop their union work. Some of these journalists are now facing charges of illegal activities and a travel ban, due to their refusal "to give in to pressure". The IFJ said that these accusations are "malicious" and "should be dropped immediately". The IFJ explained that the campaign against PJS members began in March 2012, after their election, and included a raid organized by Hamas supporters who took over the PJS offices in Gaza with the help of the security forces, and subsequently evicted the staff and elected officials. Other harassment includes the targeting of individuals who were bullied into stopping union work. The IFJ backed the PJS and called on Prime Minister Ismail Haniyeh to intervene to stop "his officials' unwarranted interference in journalists' affairs". In November 2012, two Gazan journalists were prevented from leaving Gaza by Hamas. There were scheduled to participate in a conference in Cairo, Egypt. After being questioned by security forces, their passports were confiscated. In 2016 Reporters Without Borders condemned Hamas for censorship and for torturing journalists. Reporters Without Borders Secretary-General Christophe Deloire said "As living conditions in the Gaza Strip are disastrous, Hamas wants to silence critics and does not hesitate to torture a journalist in order to control media coverage in its territory."

Human rights abuses 
In June 2011, the Independent Commission for Human Rights based in Ramallah published a report whose findings included that the Palestinians in the West Bank and the Gaza Strip were subjected in 2010 to an "almost systematic campaign" of human rights abuses by the Palestinian Authority and Hamas, as well as by Israeli authorities, with the security forces belonging to the PA and Hamas being responsible for torture, arrests and arbitrary detentions.

In 2012, the Human Rights Watch presented a 43-page long list of human rights violations committed by Hamas. Among actions attributed to Hamas, the HRW report mentions beatings with metal clubs and rubber hoses, hanging of alleged collaborationists with Israel, and torture of 102 individuals. According to the report, Hamas also tortured civil society activists and peaceful protesters. Reflecting on the captivity of Gilad Shalit, the HRW report described it as "cruel and inhuman". The report also slams Hamas for harassment of people based on so-called morality offenses and for media censorship. In a public statement Joe Stork, the deputy Middle East director of HRW claimed, "after five years of Hamas rule in Gaza, its criminal justice system reeks of injustice, routinely violates detainees' rights and grants impunity to abusive security services." Hamas responded by denying charges and describing them as "politically motivated".

On May 26, 2015, Amnesty International released a report saying that Hamas carried out extrajudicial killings, abductions and arrests of Palestinians and used the Al-Shifa Hospital to detain, interrogate and torture suspects during the Israel–Gaza conflict in 2014. It details the executions of at least 23 Palestinians accused of collaborating with Israel and torture of dozens of others, many victims of torture were members of the rival Palestinian movement, Fatah.

In 2019, Osama Qawassmeh, a Fatah spokesman in the West Bank, accused Hamas of "kidnapping and brutally torturing Fatah members in a way that no Palestinian can imagine." Qawassmeh accused Hamas of kidnapping and torturing 100 Fatah members in Gaza. The torture allegedly included the practice called "shabah"—the painful binding of the hands and feet to a chair. Also in 2019, Fatah activist from Gaza Raed Abu al-Hassin was beaten and had his two legs broken by Hamas security officers. Al-Hassin was taken into custody by Hamas after he participated in a pro-Abbas demonstration in the Gaza Strip.

International support 
Hamas has always maintained leadership abroad. The movement is deliberately fragmented to ensure that Israel cannot kill its top political and military leaders. Hamas used to be strongly allied with both Iran and Syria. Iran gave Hamas an estimated $13–15 million in 2011 as well as access to long-range missiles. Hamas's political bureau was once located in the Syrian capital of Damascus before the start of the Syrian civil war. Relations between Hamas, Iran, and Syria began to turn cold when Hamas refused to back the government of Syrian President Bashar al-Assad. Instead, Hamas backed the Sunni rebels fighting against Assad. As a result, Iran cut funding to Hamas, and Iranian ally Hezbollah ordered Hamas members out of Lebanon. Hamas was then forced out of Syria. Since then, Hamas has tried to mend fences with Iran and Hezbollah. Hamas contacted Jordan and Sudan to see if either would open up its borders to its political bureau, but both countries refused, although they welcomed many Hamas members leaving Syria. In 2012, Hamas headquarters subsequently moved to Doha, Qatar.

From 2012 to 2013, under the leadership of Muslim Brotherhood President Mohamed Morsi, Hamas had the support of Egypt. However, when Morsi was removed from office, his replacement Abdul Fattah al-Sisi outlawed the Muslim Brotherhood and destroyed the tunnels Hamas built into Egypt. The United Arab Emirates and Saudi Arabia are likewise hostile to Hamas. Like Egypt, they designated the Brotherhood as a terrorist organization and Hamas was viewed as its Palestinian equivalent.

Qatar and Turkey 

According to Middle East experts, now Hamas has two firm allies: Qatar and Turkey. Both give Hamas public and financial assistance estimated to be in the hundreds of millions of dollars. Qatar has transferred more than $1.8 billion to Hamas. Shashank Joshi, senior research fellow at the Royal United Services Institute, says that "Qatar also hosts Hamas's political bureau which includes Hamas leader Khaled Meshaal." Meshaal also visits Turkey frequently to meet with Turkish Prime Minister Recep Tayyip Erdoğan. Erdogan has dedicated himself to breaking Hamas out of its political and economic seclusion. On U.S. television, Erdogan said in 2012 that "I don't see Hamas as a terror organization. Hamas is a political party."

Qatar has been called Hamas' most important financial backer and foreign ally. In 2007, Qatar was, with Turkey, the only country to back Hamas after the group ousted the Palestinian Authority from the Gaza Strip. The relationship between Hamas and Qatar strengthened in 2008 and 2009 when Khaled Meshaal was invited to attend the Doha Summit where he was seated next to the then Qatari Emir Hamad bin Khalifa al-Thani, who pledged $250 million to repair the damage caused by Israel in the Israeli war on Gaza. These events caused Qatar to become the main player in the "Palestinian issue". Qatar called Gaza's blockade unjust and immoral, which prompted the Hamas government in Gaza, including former Prime Minister Ismail Haniyeh, to thank Qatar for their "unconditional" support. Qatar then began regularly handing out political, material, humanitarian and charitable support for Hamas.

In 2012, Qatar's former Emir, Hamad bin Khalifa al-Thani, became the first head of state to visit Gaza under Hamas rule. He pledged to raise $400 million for reconstruction. Some have argued that the money Qatar gives to reconstruct Palestine is an excuse to pour even more money into Hamas. Qatar's reason for funding Hamas, which is shared by Recep Tayyip Erdoğan, is alleged that Islamist groups are growing and will eventually play a role in the region; thus it is important for Qatar (and Turkey) to maintain ties. During the Arab Spring, for example, Qatar backed the Muslim Brotherhood, the Egyptian Islamist group whose offshoot is Hamas. Other sources say that advocating for Hamas is politically beneficial to Turkey and Qatar because the Palestinian cause draws popular support amongst their citizens at home.

Some began to label Qatar a terrorist haven in part because it is harboring Hamas leader Meshaal. They also harbor Husam Badran, former leader of Hamas's military wing in the northern West Bank. Husam Badran, current media spokesman for Hamas, was the instigator of several of the deadliest suicide bombings of the second intifada, including the Dolphinarium discotheque bombing in Tel Aviv, which killed 21 people. Turkey has also been criticized for housing terrorists including Saleh al-Arouri, the senior Hamas official, known for his ability to mastermind attacks from abroad. Al-Arouri is alleged to have orchestrated the June 2014 abduction and killing of three Israeli teenagers and to have started the 50-day war between Israel and Palestine, and now lives in Turkey.

Speaking in reference to Qatar's support for Hamas, during a 2015 visit to Palestine, Qatari official Mohammad al-Emadi, said Qatar is using the money not to help Hamas but rather the Palestinian people as a whole. He acknowledges however that giving to the Palestinian people means using Hamas as the local contact. Emadi said, "You have to support them. You don't like them, don't like them. But they control the country, you know." Some argue that Hamas's relations with Qatar are putting Hamas in an awkward position because Qatar has become part of the regional Arab problem. However, Hamas claims that having contacts with various Arab countries establishes positive relations which will encourage Arab countries to do their duty toward the Palestinians and support their cause by influencing public opinion in the Arab world. In March 2015, Hamas has announced its support of the Saudi Arabian-led military intervention in Yemen against the Shia Houthis and forces loyal to former President Ali Abdullah Saleh.

In May 2018, Turkish president Recep Tayyip Erdoğan tweeted to the Prime Minister of Israel Benjamin Netanyahu that Hamas is not a terrorist organization but a resistance movement that defends the Palestinian homeland against an occupying power. During that period there were conflicts between Israeli troops and Palestinian protestors in the Gaza Strip, due to the decision of the United States to move their embassy to Jerusalem. In addition, in 2018 the Israel Security Agency accused SADAT International Defense Consultancy (a private Turkish Private military company with connections to the Turkish government) of transferring funds to Hamas.

China 
After the Hamas victory in 2006, China did not label it a "terrorist organization" and welcomed Hamas' foreign minister, Mahmoud al-Zahar, to Beijing for the China-Arab Cooperation Forum ignoring protests by both the United States and Israel but receiving praise from Mahmoud Abbas. China has harshly criticised Israel for its economic blockade of Gaza since 2007 when Hamas assumed control of the territory. Chinese foreign ministry spokesman Liu Jianchao stated, "We believe that the Palestinian government is legally elected by the people there and it should be respected". In April 2011, a spokesman from China's foreign ministry embraced the Hamas-Fatah agreement to form an interim government.

In 2014, Chinese Foreign Minister Wang Yi called on Israel to lift its blockade and advised both Israel and Hamas to cease fighting. He reaffirmed support from China to the Palestinian people's right to establish an independent state. He told a joint press conference, "China will grant $1.5 million in emergency humanitarian aid to the people of Gaza."

In June 2018, China voted in support of a United Nations Security Council resolution vetoed by the US that criticized Israel of excessive, disproportionate and indiscriminate force by the Israeli forces against Palestinian civilians in Gaza during the 2018 Gaza border protests. Later the same day, China abstained from voting on a US drafted resolution that blamed Hamas for the escalated violence.

Public opinion about Hamas 
Prior to 2006, Hamas was well regarded by Palestinians for its efficiency and perceived lack of corruption compared to Fatah. Public opinions of Hamas have deteriorated after it took control of the Gaza Strip in 2007. Prior to the takeover, 62% of Palestinians had held a favorable view of the group, while a third had negative views. According to a 2014 Pew Research just prior to the 2014 Israel–Gaza conflict, only about a third had positive opinions and more than half viewed Hamas negatively. Furthermore, 68% of Israeli Arabs viewed Hamas negatively.

Hamas popularity surged after the war in 2014 with polls reporting that 81 percent of Palestinians felt that Hamas had "won" that war.

In Lebanon, 65% see Hamas negatively. In Jordan and Egypt, roughly 60% see Hamas negatively, and in Turkey, 80% have a negative opinion of Hamas. In Tunisia, 42% have a negative opinion of Hamas, while 56% of Bangladeshis and 44% of Indonesians have a negative opinion of Hamas.

Legal action against Hamas

In the United States
The charitable trust Holy Land Foundation for Relief and Development was accused in December 2001 of funding Hamas. The U.S. Justice Department filed 200 charges against the foundation. The case first ended in a mistrial, in which jurors acquitted on some counts and were deadlocked on charges ranging from tax violations to providing material support for terrorists. In a retrial, on November 24, 2008, the five leaders of the Foundation were convicted on 108 counts.

Several U.S. organizations were either shut down or held liable for financing Hamas in early 2001, groups that have origins from the mid-1990s, among them the Holy Land Foundation (HLF), Islamic Association for Palestine (IAP), and Kind Hearts. The U.S. Treasury Department specially designated the HLF in 2001 for terror ties because from 1995 to 2001 the HLF transferred "approximately $12.4 million outside of the United States with the intent to contribute funds, goods, and services to Hamas." According to the Treasury Department, Khaled Meshal identified one of HLF's officers, Mohammed El-Mezain as "the Hamas leader for the U.S." In 2003, IAP was found liable for financially supporting Hamas, and in 2006, Kind Hearts had their assets frozen for supporting Hamas.

In 2004, a federal court in the United States found Hamas liable in a civil lawsuit for the 1996 murders of Yaron and Efrat Ungar near Bet Shemesh, Israel. Hamas was ordered to pay the families of the Ungars $116 million. The Palestinian Authority settled the lawsuit in 2011. The settlement terms were not disclosed. On August 20, 2004, three Palestinians, one a naturalized American citizen, were charged with a "lengthy racketeering conspiracy to provide money for terrorist acts in Israel". The indicted included Mousa Mohammed Abu Marzook, who had left the US in 1997. On February 1, 2007, two men were acquitted of contravening United States law by supporting Hamas. Both men argued that they helped move money for Palestinian causes aimed at helping the Palestinian people and not to promote terrorism.

In January 2009, a Federal prosecutor accused the Council on American-Islamic Relations of having links to a charity designated as a support network for Hamas. The Justice Department identified CAIR as an "un-indicted co-conspirator" in the Holy Land Foundation case. Later, a federal appeals court removed that label for all parties and instead, named them "joint venturers". CAIR was never charged with any crime, and it complained that the designation had tarnished its reputation.

In Germany
A German federal court ruled in 2004 that Hamas was a unified organisation whose humanitarian aid work could not be separated from its "terrorist and political activities". In July 2010, Germany also outlawed Frankfurt-based International Humanitarian Aid Organization (IHH e.V.), saying it had used donations to support Hamas-affiliated relief projects in Gaza. While presenting their activities to donors as humanitarian assistance, German Interior Minister Thomas de Maiziere said, IHH e.V. had "exploited trusting donors' willingness to help by using money that was given for a good purpose for supporting what is, in the final analysis, a terrorist organization". A spokesperson for the Islamic Human Rights Commission described the decision as "a victory for those who seek to stigmatise all Islamic activism as supporting terrorism".

See also

 25th anniversary of Hamas
 Hamastan
 Human rights in the Palestinian National Authority
 List of political parties in the Palestinian National Authority

Notes and references

Notes

Citations

Sources

Books

Journal articles

Other

External links

  
Official website 
 Hamas leaders CFR
 Hamas Charter
 The Covenant of the Islamic Resistance Movement (Hamas) (includes interpretation)
 Hamas Shifts From Rockets to Public Relations The New York Times, July 23, 2009
 22 years on the start of Hamas Al-Qassam Brigades' Information Office
 Fatah and Hamas Human Rights Violations in the Palestinian Occupied Territories in 2007 by Elizabeth Freed of Palestinian Human Rights Monitoring Group
 Sadiki, Larbi, Tests and contests: Hamas without Syria
 Sherifa Zuhur, Hamas and Israel: Conflicting Strategies of Group-Based Politics (PDF file) December 2008
 "Hamas threatens attacks on US: Terrorist warns 'Middle East is full of American targets Ynet News. December 24, 2006. Accessed July 20, 2014.

 
1987 establishments in the Palestinian territories
Anti-Zionism in the Palestinian territories
Antisemitism in the Middle East
Antisemitism in the Arab world
Holocaust denial
Islam and antisemitism
Islamism in Israel
Islamism in the State of Palestine
Islamic political parties
Islamic fundamentalism
Jihadist groups
Muslim Brotherhood
National liberation movements
Organizations based in Asia designated as terrorist
Organisations designated as terrorist by Japan
Palestinian militant groups
Palestinian nationalist parties
Palestinian political parties
Palestinian terrorism
Political parties established in 1987
Rebel groups that actively control territory
Resistance movements
Sunni Islamist groups
Organisations designated as terrorist by Australia
Organizations designated as terrorist by Canada
Organizations designated as terrorist by the United States
Organisations designated as terrorist by the United Kingdom